= Aachen =

City in North Rhine-Westphalia, Germany

Aachen Oche (Aachen dialect)
- City
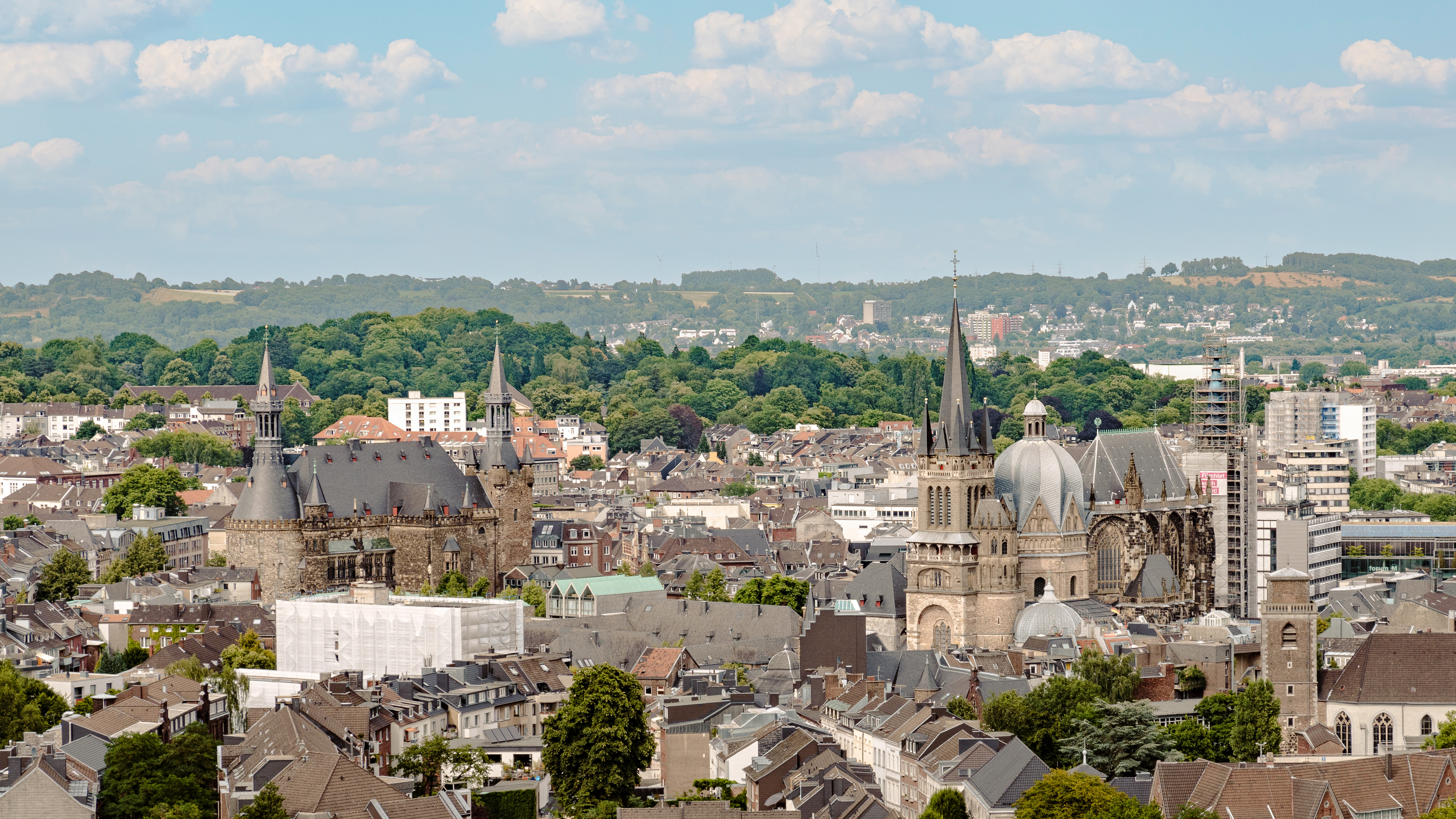
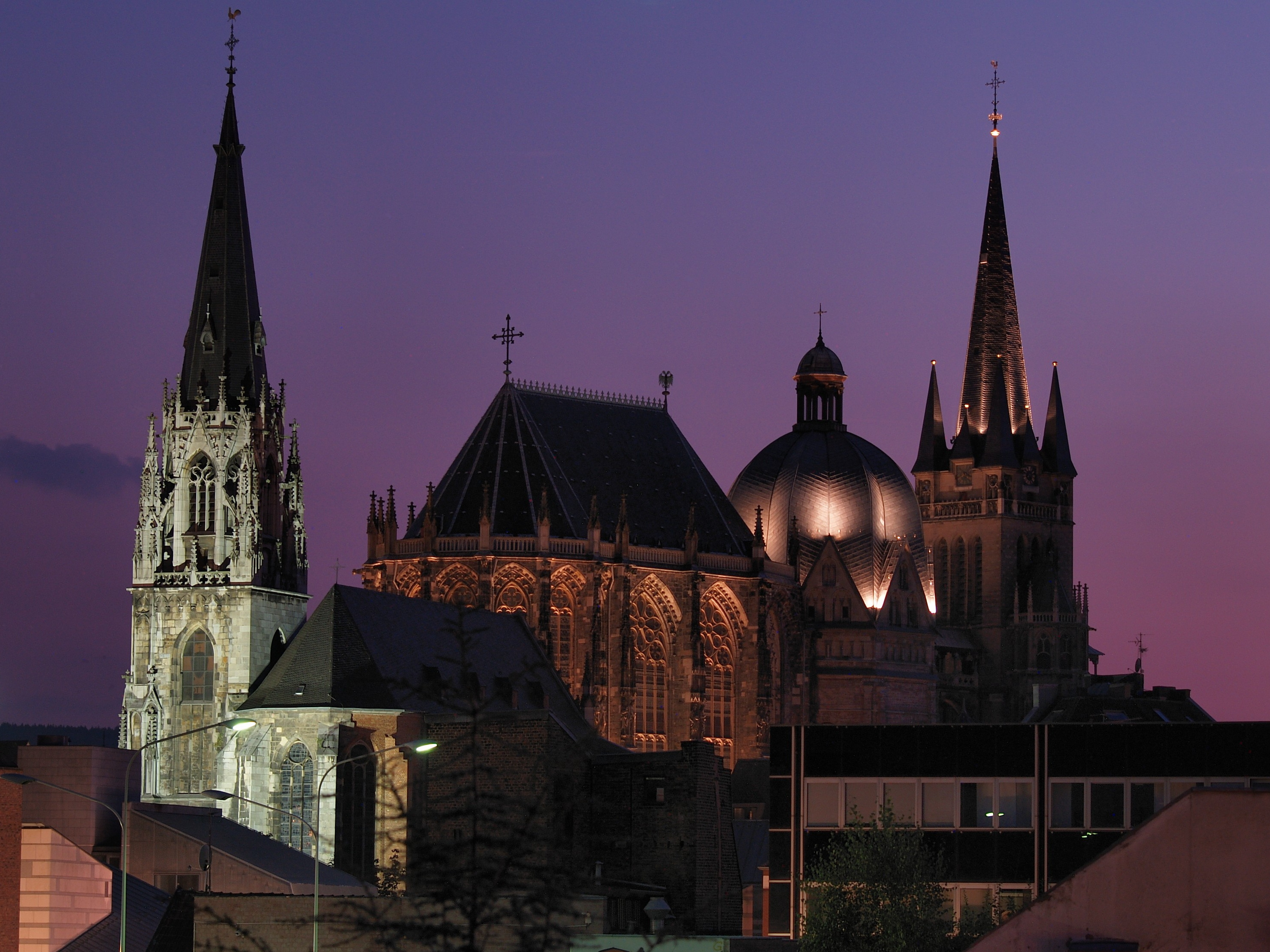
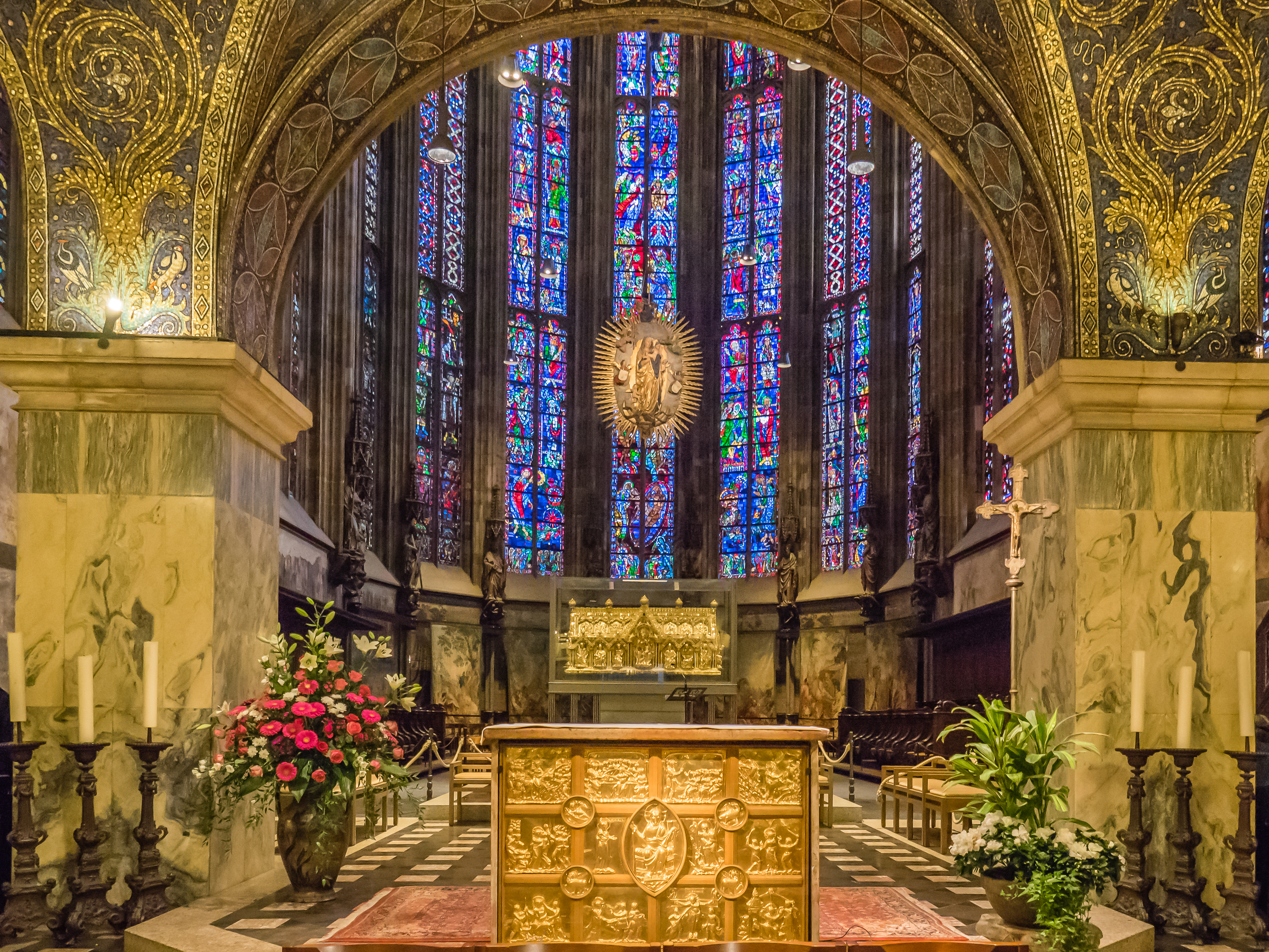
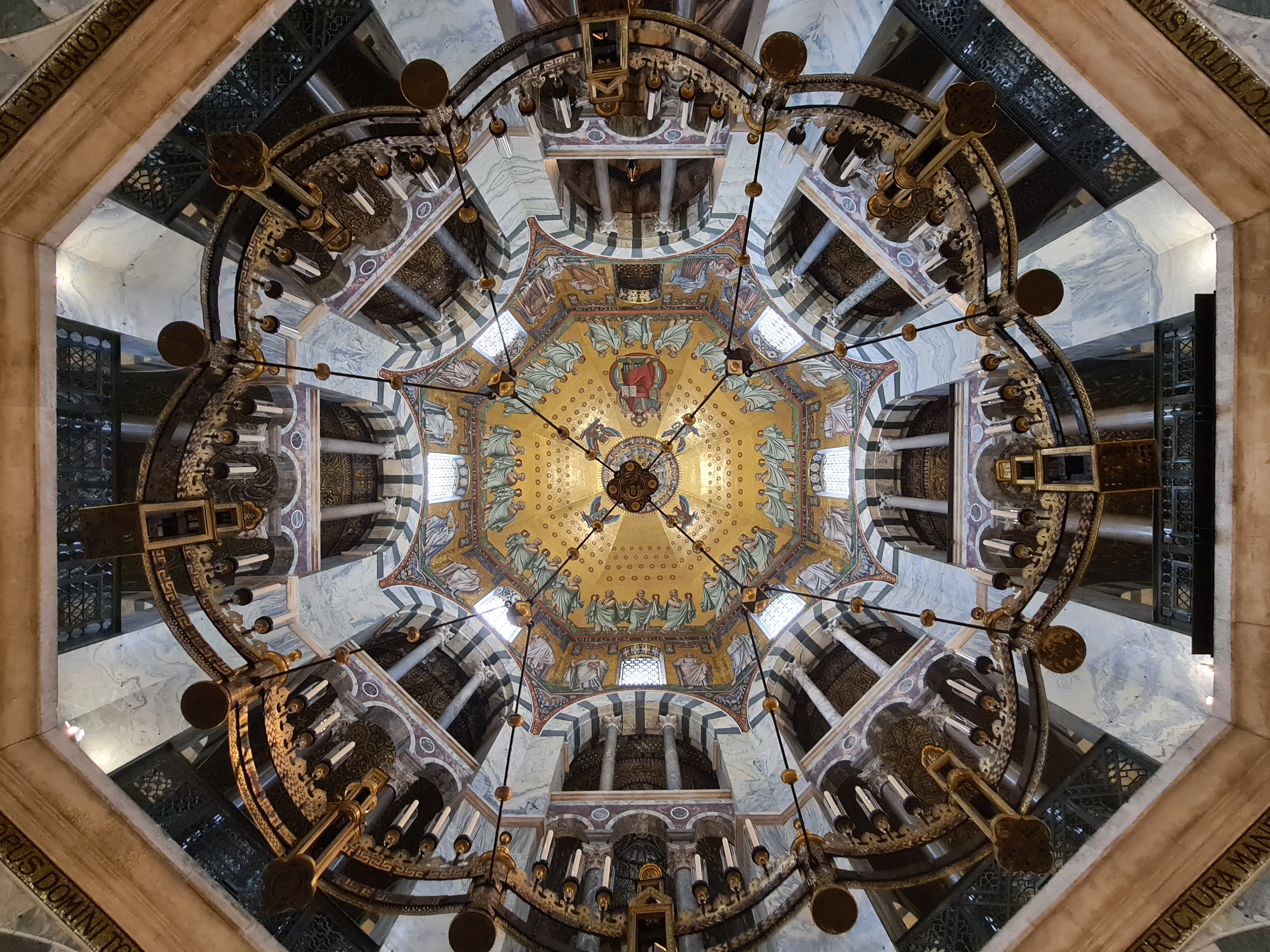
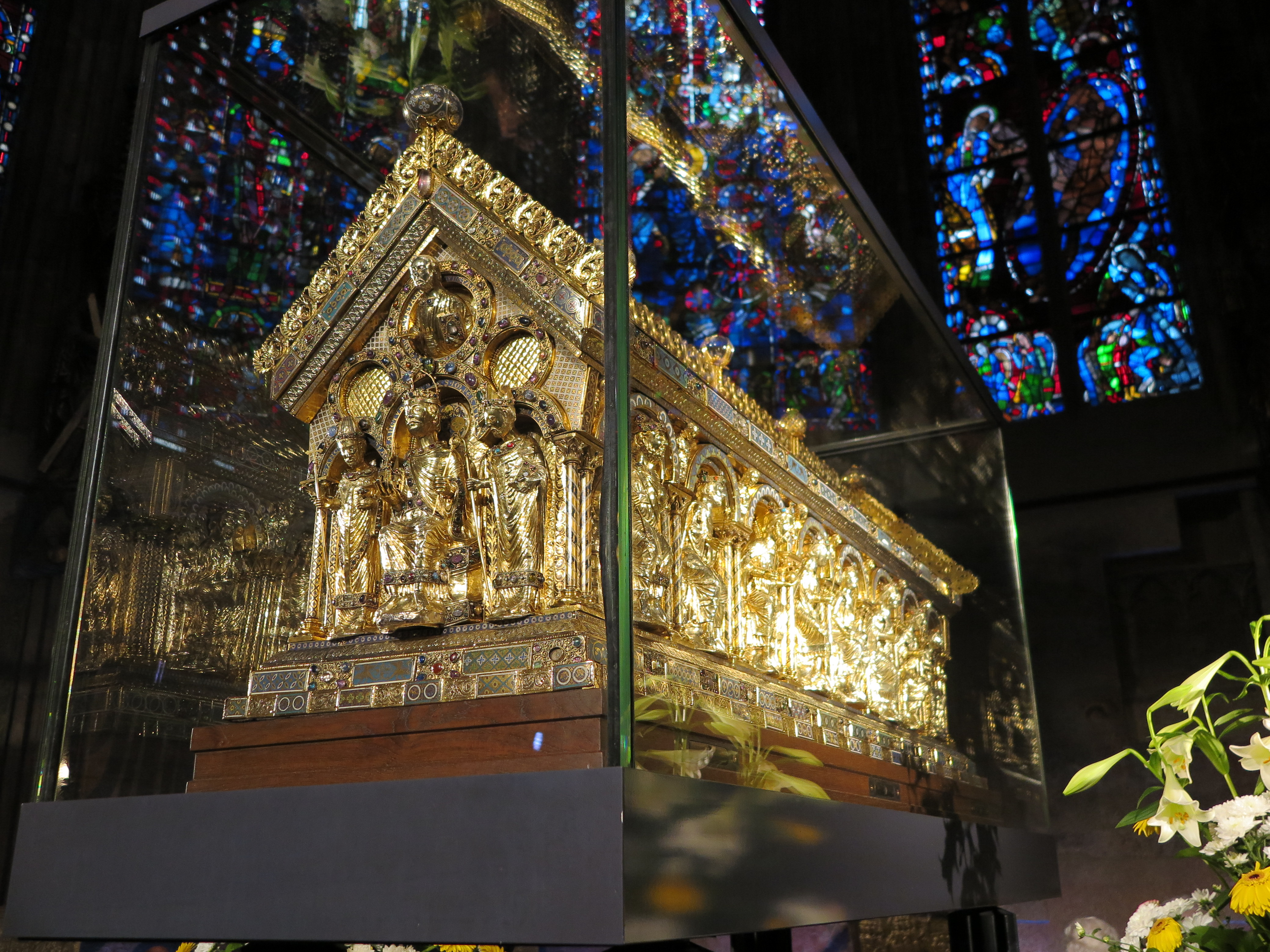
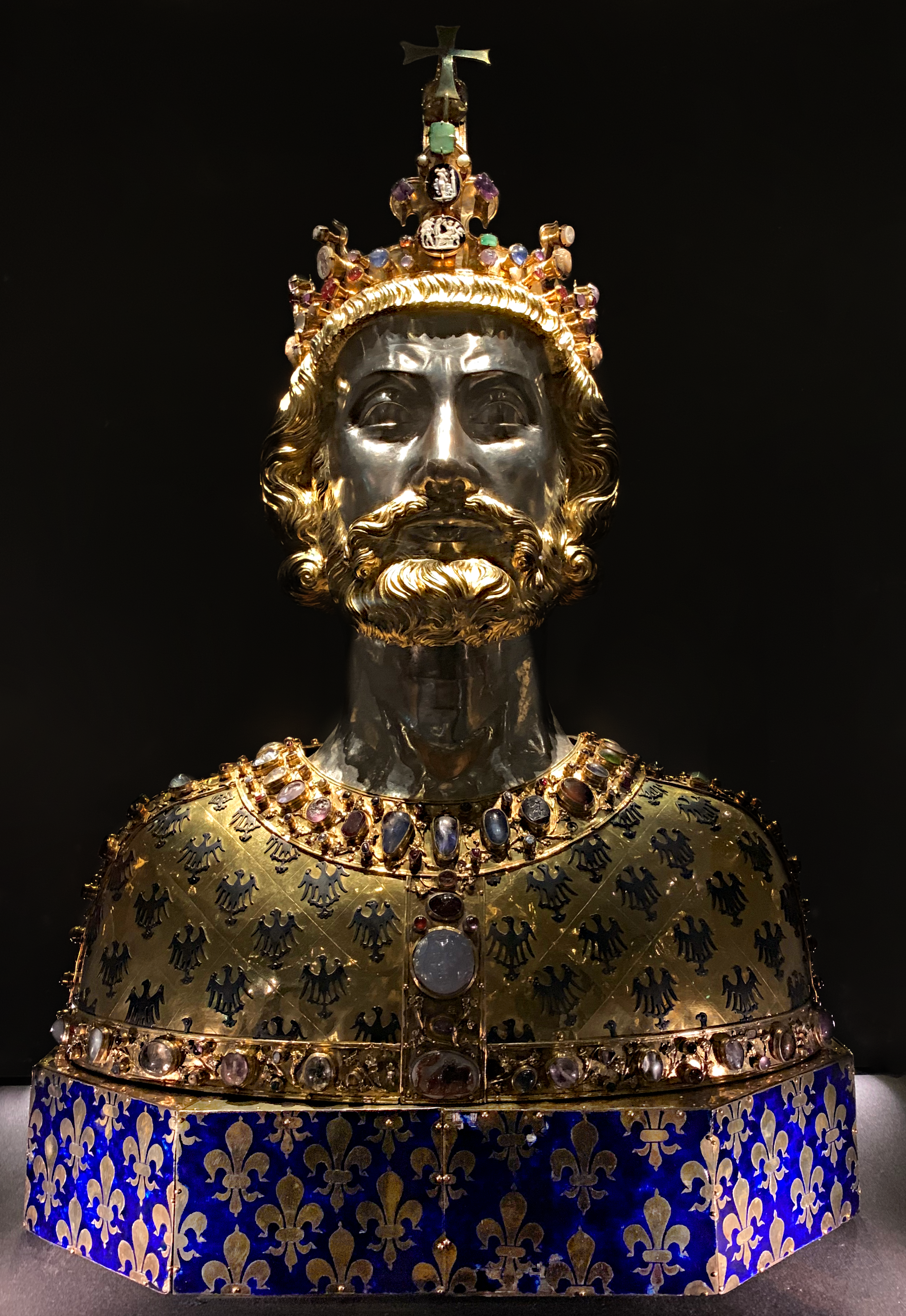
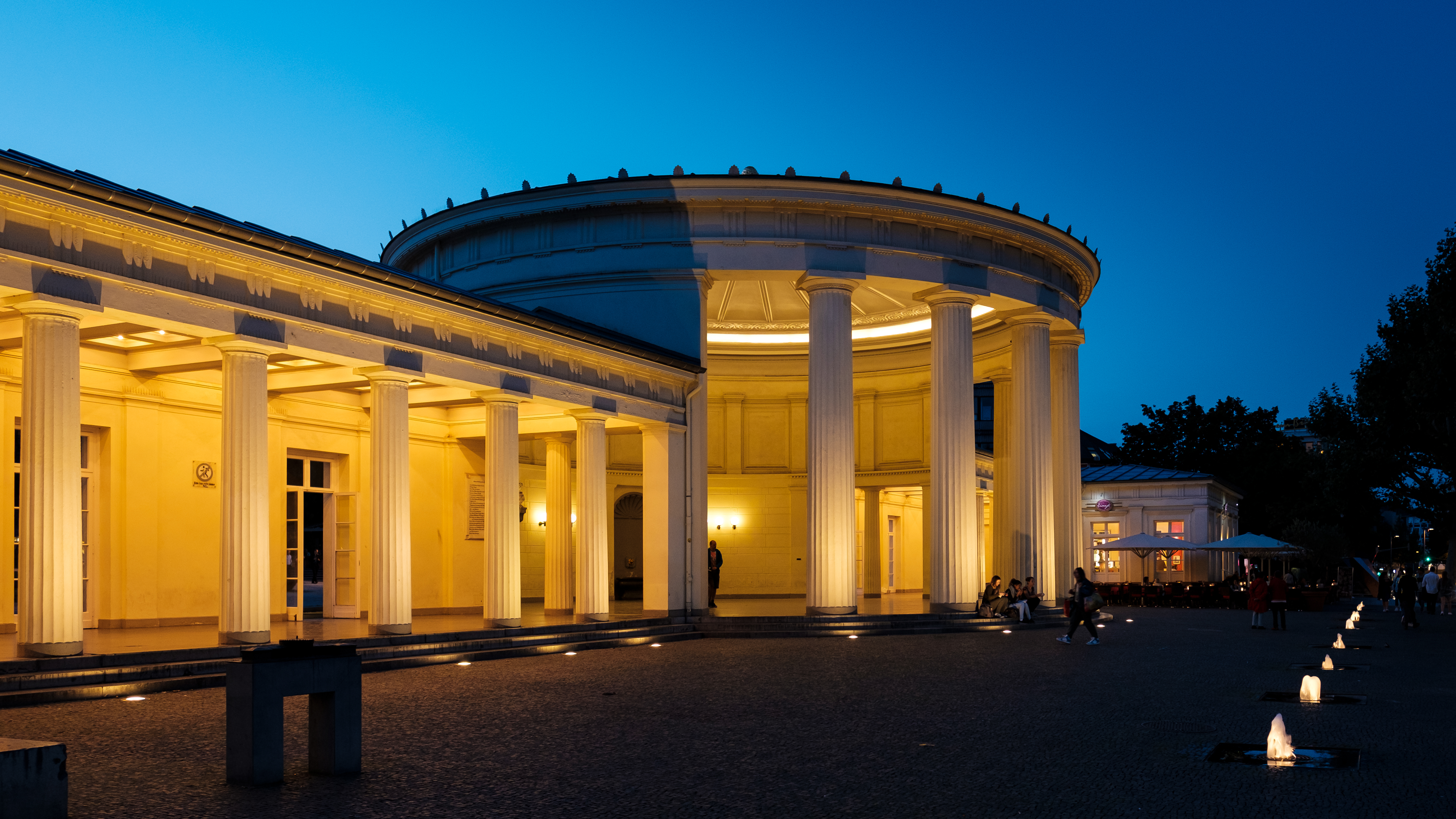
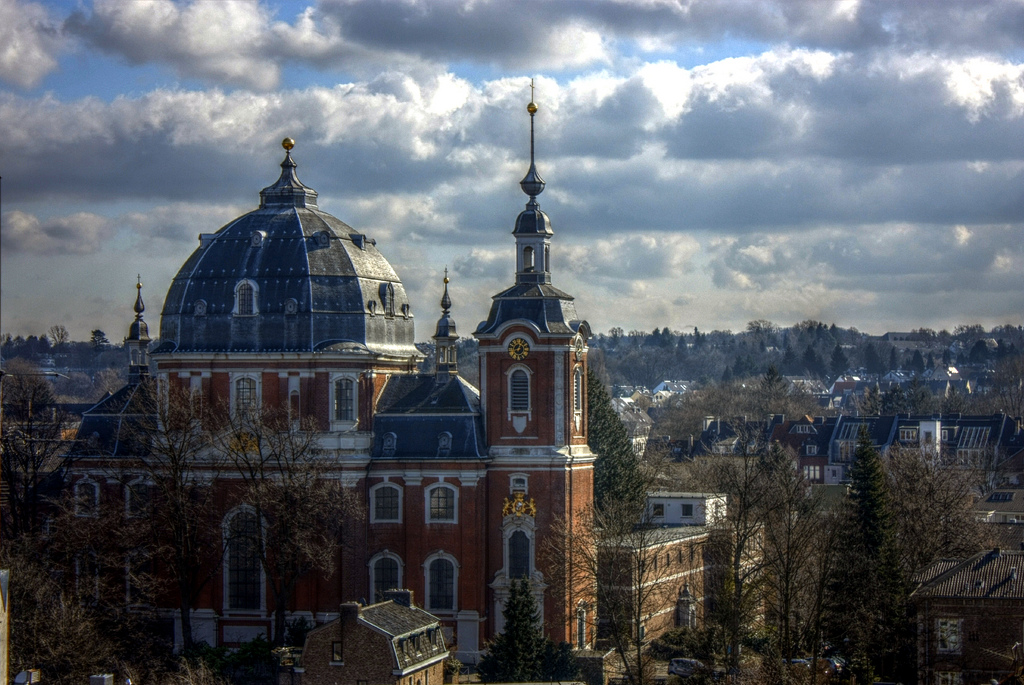
- View over Aachen with the town hall and the cathedral Aachen Cathedral and St. Foillan's Church Cathedral main altar, and choir Octagon of the Palatine Chapel Shrine of Charlemagne Bust of Charlemagne Elisenbrunnen Burtscheid Abbey

- Flag Coat of arms

- Location of Aachen within Städteregion Aachen
- Interactive map of Aachen
- Location within Germany Location within North Rhine-Westphalia
- Coordinates: 50°46′32″N 06°05′01″E
- Country: Germany
- State: North Rhine-Westphalia
- Admin. region: Cologne
- District: Aachen

Government
  - Mayor (2025–30): Michael Ziemons (CDU)
  - Governing parties: The Greens/ SPD

Area
  - Total: 160.85 km^{2} (62.10 sq mi)
- Elevation: 173 m (568 ft)

Population (2025-12-31)
  - Total: 263,703
  - Density: 1,639.4/km^{2} (4,246.1/sq mi)
- Time zone: UTC+01:00 (CET)
  - Summer (DST): UTC+02:00 (CEST)
- Postal codes: 52062–52080
- Dialling codes: 0241 / 02405 / 02407 / 02408
- Vehicle registration: AC / MON
- Website: aachen.de (in German)

Location of Aachen in the Meuse (Dutch and German: Maas) river system (Wurm→ Rur→ Meuse→ North Sea)

Aachen (Note: Pronunciation: English: /'ɑːkən/ AH-kən; German: [ˈaːxn̩]; Other names: Aachen dialect: Oche [ˈɔːxə]; Dutch: Aken [ˈaːkə(n)]; French (and historical English): Aix-la-Chapelle (UK: /ˌɛks lə ʃəˈpɛl/ EKS lə shə-PEL, US: /ˌɛks lɑː ʃɑːˈpɛl, ˌeɪks -/ EKS lah shah-PEL, AYKS -; French: [ɛks la ʃapɛl])) is the 13th-largest city in North Rhine-Westphalia and the 27th-largest city of Germany, with around 264,000 inhabitants. It is the western-most major city in Germany, lying approximately 61 km (38 mi) west of Cologne and Bonn, directly bordering Belgium in the southwest, and the Netherlands in the northwest. The city lies in the Meuse–Rhine Euroregion and is the seat of the district of Aachen (Städteregion Aachen).

The once Celtic settlement was equipped with several thermae in the course of colonization by Roman pioneers settling at the warm Aachen thermal springs around the 1st century. After the withdrawal of the Roman troops, the vicus Aquae Granni was brought under Frankish control around the 5th century, by which it came under Merovingian and later Carolingian rule. With the completion of the Carolingian Palace of Aachen at the transition to the 9th century, Aachen was constituted as the main royal residence of the Frankish Empire ruled by Charlemagne. Because of that, the city is sometimes called the "cradle of Europe". After the Treaty of Verdun, the city was within the borders of Middle Francia, until it became part of East Francia after the Treaty of Meerssen (870). It subsequently was part of the Holy Roman Empire and was granted city rights in 1166 by Emperor Frederick Barbarossa, becoming an imperial city. It served as the coronation site where 31 Holy Roman Emperors were crowned Kings of the Germans from 936 to 1531, until Frankfurt became the preferred place of coronation.

One of Germany's leading institutes of higher education in technology, the RWTH Aachen University (Rheinisch-Westfälisch Technische Hochschule Aachen), is located in the city. Its university hospital Uniklinikum Aachen is Europe's largest single-building hospital. Aachen's industries include science, engineering and information technology. In 2009, Aachen was ranked eighth among cities in Germany for innovation.

Aachen is located at the northern foothills of the High Fens and the Eifel Mountains. It sits on the Wurm River, a tributary of the Rur, and together with Mönchengladbach, it is the only larger German city in the drainage basin of the Meuse. The regional dialect spoken in the city is a Central Franconian, Ripuarian variant with strong Limburgish influences from the dialects in the neighbouring Netherlands. As a Rhenish city, Aachen is one of the main centres of carnival celebrations in Germany, along with Cologne and Mainz. The culinary specialty for which the city is best known is Aachener Printen, a type of gingerbread.

== Etymology ==
The name Aachen is a modern descendant, like southern German Ach(e), German: Aach, meaning "river" or "stream", from Old High German ahha, meaning "water" or "stream", which directly translates (and etymologically corresponds) to Latin Aquae, referring to the springs. The location has been inhabited by humans since the Neolithic era, about 5,000 years ago, attracted to its warm mineral springs. Latin Aquae figures in Aachen's Roman name Aquae granni, which meant "waters of Grannus", referring to the Celtic god of healing who was worshipped at the springs. This word became Åxhe in Walloon and Aix in French, and subsequently Aix-la-Chapelle to distinguish it from Aix-en-Provence, after Charlemagne had his palatine chapel built there in the late 8th century and then made the city his empire's capital.

The city is known by a variety of different names in other languages:

Language	Name	Pronunciation in IPA
Aachen dialect	Oche	[ˈɔːxə]
Basque	Akisgran	[akisɡɾan]
Catalan	Aquisgrà	[əkizˈɣɾa], [akizˈɣɾa]
Czech	Cáchy	[ˈtsaːxɪ]
Dutch / Low German	Aken	[ˈaːkə(n)]
French	Aix-la-Chapelle	[ɛks la ʃapɛl]
Greek	Ακυίσγρανον (Akyísgranon)	[aciˈizɣranon]
Italian	Aquisgrana	[akwizˈɡraːna]
Latin	Aquisgrana, Aquae Granni, Aquis Granum	
Limburgish	Aoke	[ˈɔːkə]
Luxembourgish	Oochen	[ˈoːχən]
Occitan	Aquisgran, Ais d'Alemanha, Ais de la Capèla, Ais dau Ren	[akisˈɡɾan], [ˈajs da.leˈmaɲɔ], [ˈajs de la kaˈpɛlɔ], [ˈajs daw ˈrɛn]
Polish	Akwizgran	[aˈkfizɡran]
Portuguese	Aquisgrano, Aquisgrão	European Portuguese: [ɐkiʒˈɣɾɐnu], [ɐkiʒˈɣɾɐ̃w]
Russian	Ахен (Akhen)	[ˈaxʲɪn]
Spanish	Aquisgrán	[akisˈɣɾan]
Walloon	Åxhe	[ɑːç]

== History ==
=== Early history ===
Flint quarries on the Lousberg, Schneeberg, and Königshügel, first used during Neolithic times (3000–2500 BC), attest to the long occupation of the site of Aachen, as do recent finds under the modern city's Elisengarten pointing to a former settlement from the same period. Bronze Age (around 1600 BC) settlement is evidenced by the remains of barrows (burial mounds) found, for example, on the Klausberg. During the Iron Age, the area was settled by Celtic peoples who were perhaps drawn by the marshy Aachen basin's hot sulphur springs where they worshipped Grannus, god of light and healing. Proofs of a Celts settlements on Aachens territories at the beginning of the Gallic War do not exist at the moment.

The 25-hectare (60 acre) Roman spa resort town of Aquae Granni was, according to legend, founded by Grenus, under Hadrian, around 124 AD. Grenus refers to the Celtic god, and it seems it was the Roman 6th Legion at the start of the 1st century AD that first channelled the hot springs into a spa at Büchel, (Note: This audio file is Andreas Schaub explaining the archaeological record in court in Archäologie am Hof.) adding at the end of the same century the Münstertherme spa, two water pipelines, and a probable sanctuary dedicated to Grannus. A kind of forum, surrounded by colonnades, connected the two spa complexes. There was an extensive residential area. The Romans built bathhouses near Burtscheid. A temple precinct called Vernenum was built near the modern Kornelimünster/Walheim. Today, remains have been found of three bathhouses, including two fountains in the Elisenbrunnen and the Burtscheid bathhouse.

Roman civil administration in Aachen eventually broke down as the baths and other public buildings (along with most of the villae rusticae of the surrounding countryside) were destroyed around AD 375 at the start of the migration period. The last Roman coin finds are from the time of Emperor Gratian (AD 375–383). Rome withdrew its troops from the area, but the town remained populated. By 470, the town came to be ruled by the Ripuarian Franks and subordinated to their capital, Cologne. During the Roman period, Aachen was the site of a flourishing Jewish community.

=== Middle Ages ===
Pepin the Short had a castle residence built in the town, due to the proximity of the hot springs and also for strategic reasons as it is located between the Rhineland and northern France. Einhard mentions that in 765–766 Pepin spent both Christmas and Easter at Aquis villa (Et celebravit natalem Domini in Aquis villa et pascha similiter) ("and [he] celebrated the birth of the Lord [Christmas] in the town Aquis, and similarly Easter"), which must have been sufficiently equipped to support the royal household for several months. In the year of his coronation as king of the Franks, 768, Charlemagne came to spend Christmas at Aachen for the first time. (Note: This is in dispute, as some history books state that Charlemagne was in fact born in Aachen in 742.) He remained there in a mansion which he may have extended, although there is no source attesting to any significant building activity at Aachen in his time, apart from the building of the Palatine Chapel (since 1930, cathedral) and the Palace.

Charlemagne spent most winters in Aachen between 792 and his death in 814. Aachen became the focus of his court and the political centre of his empire. During the Carolingian empire, a Jewish community lived near the royal palace. In Jewish texts, the city of Aachen was called Aish or Ash (אש). In 797, Isaac, a Jewish merchant, accompanied two ambassadors of Charlemagne to the court of Harun al-Rashid. He returned to Aachen in July 802, bearing an elephant called Abul-Abbas as a gift for the emperor. After Charlemagne's death, he was buried in the church which he had built; his original tomb has been lost, while his alleged remains are preserved in the Karlsschrein, the shrine where he was reburied after being declared a saint; his saintliness, however, was never officially acknowledged by the Roman Curia as such.

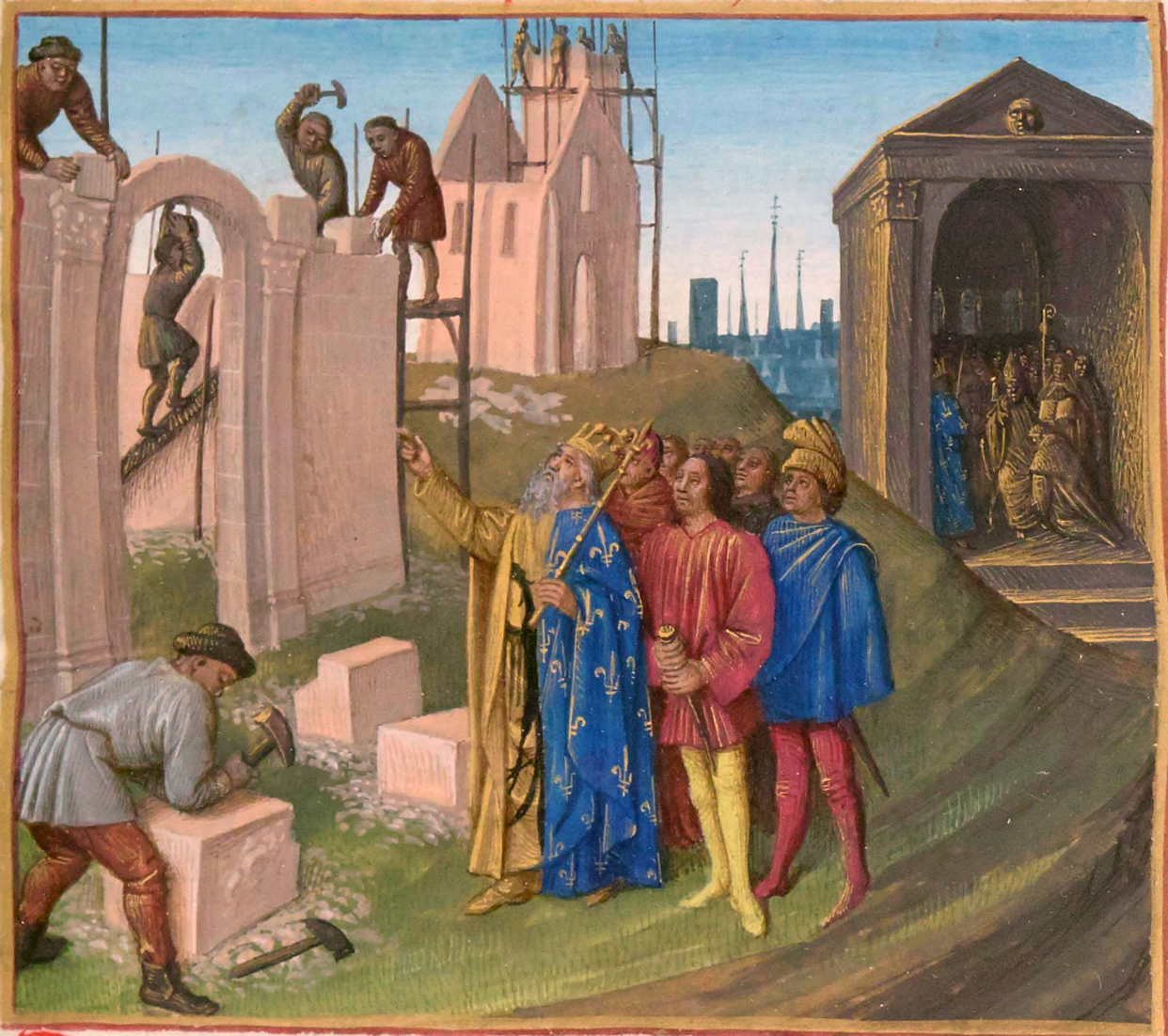
Construction of Aix-la-Chapelle, by Jean Fouquet

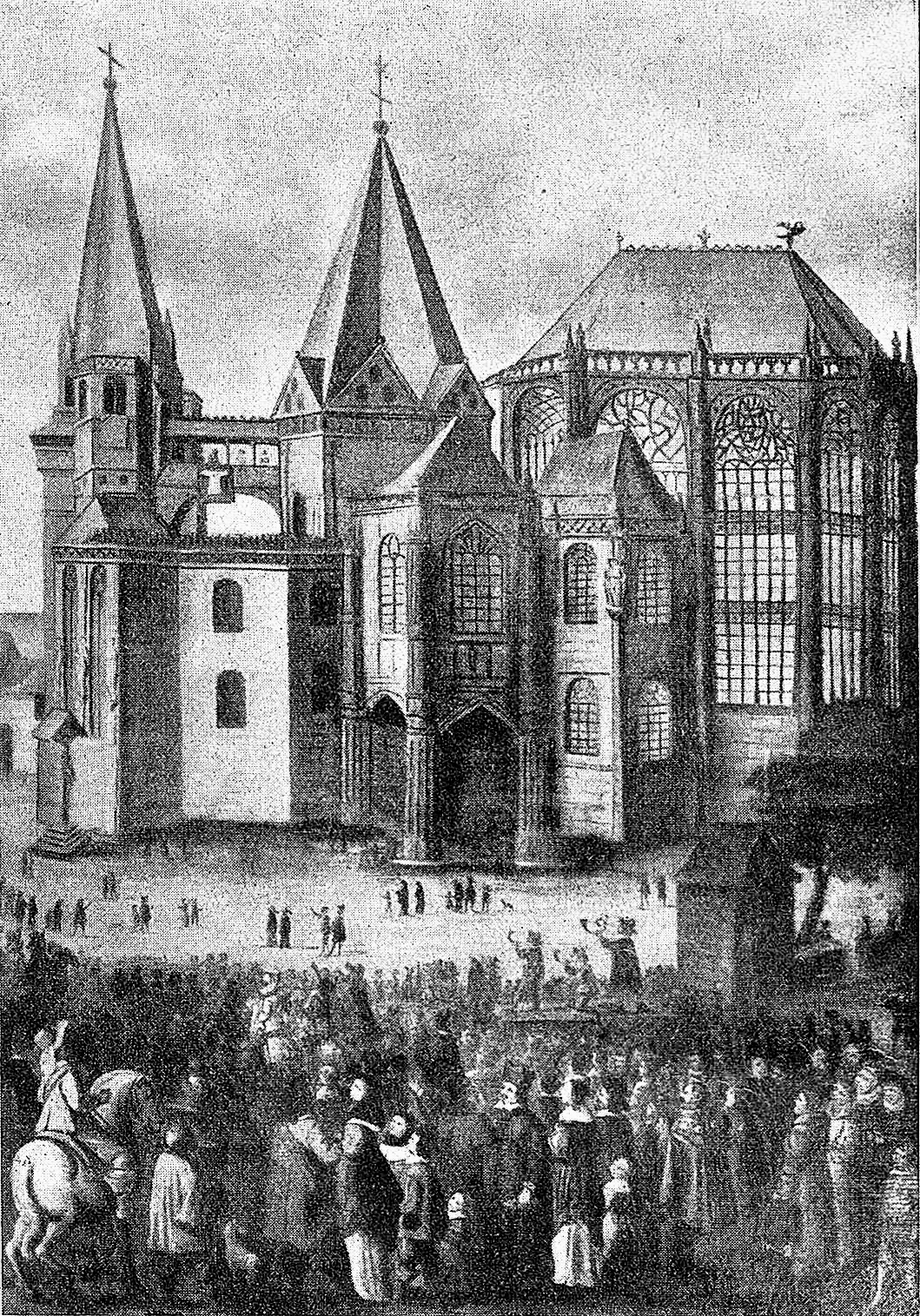
Presentation of the four "Great Relics" during the Aachen pilgrimage, after a 17th-century painting

By the terms of the Treaty of Verdun 834, Aachen became part of Middle Francia, governed by emperor Lothair. He was succeeded by Lothair II as king of Lotharingia by the terms of the Treaty of Prüm. By the Treaty of Meerssen 870, Aachen came to East Francia. Within East Francia, later the Holy Roman Empire until 1166, Aachen was part of the Duchy of Lower Lotharingia.

In 936, Otto I was crowned king of East Francia in the collegiate church built by Charlemagne. During the reign of Otto II, the nobles revolted and the West Franks under Lothair raided Aachen in 978. Aachen was attacked again by Odo of Champagne, who attacked the imperial palace while Conrad II was absent. Odo relinquished it and was killed afterwards. The palace and town of Aachen had fortifying walls built by order of Emperor Frederick Barbarossa between 1172 and 1176. Over the next 500 years, most kings of Germany who ruled the Holy Roman Empire were crowned in Aachen. The original audience hall built by Charlemagne was torn down and replaced by the current city hall in 1330. (Note: Sources differ on the age of the city hall, as the dates used for the construction were 1334–1349.) During the 13th century, many Jews converted to Christianity, as shown in the records of the Aachen Minster (today's Cathedral). In 1486, the Jews of Aachen offered gifts to Maximilian I during his coronation ceremony. The last king to be crowned here was Ferdinand I in 1531.

During the Middle Ages, Aachen remained a city of regional importance, due to its proximity to Flanders; it achieved a modest position in the trade in woollen cloths, favoured by imperial privilege. The city remained a free imperial city, subject to the emperor only, but was politically far too weak to influence the policies of any of its neighbours. The only dominion it had was over Burtscheid, a neighbouring territory ruled by a Benedictine abbess, which was forced to accept that all of its traffic must pass through the "Aachener Reich".

As an imperial city, Aachen held certain political privileges that allowed it to remain independent of the troubles of Europe for many years. It remained a direct vassal of the Holy Roman Empire throughout most of the Middle Ages. It was also the site of many important church councils, including the Council of 837 and the Council of 1166, a council convened by the antipope Paschal III.

Parts of Aachen belonged to Imperial Abbey of Burtscheid, Reichsabtei Kornelimünster, Duchy of Juelich and the Duchy of Limburg.

==== Manuscript production ====
Aachen was an important site for the production of historical manuscripts. Under Charlemagne's purview, both the Ada Gospels and the Coronation Gospels may have been produced in Aachen. In addition, quantities of the other texts in the court library were also produced locally. During the reign of Louis the Pious (814–840), substantial quantities of ancient texts were produced at Aachen, including legal manuscripts such as the leges scriptorium group, patristic texts including the five manuscripts of the Bamberg Pliny Group. Finally, under Lothair I (840–855), texts of outstanding quality were still being produced. This however marked the end of the period of manuscript production at Aachen.

=== 16th–18th centuries ===
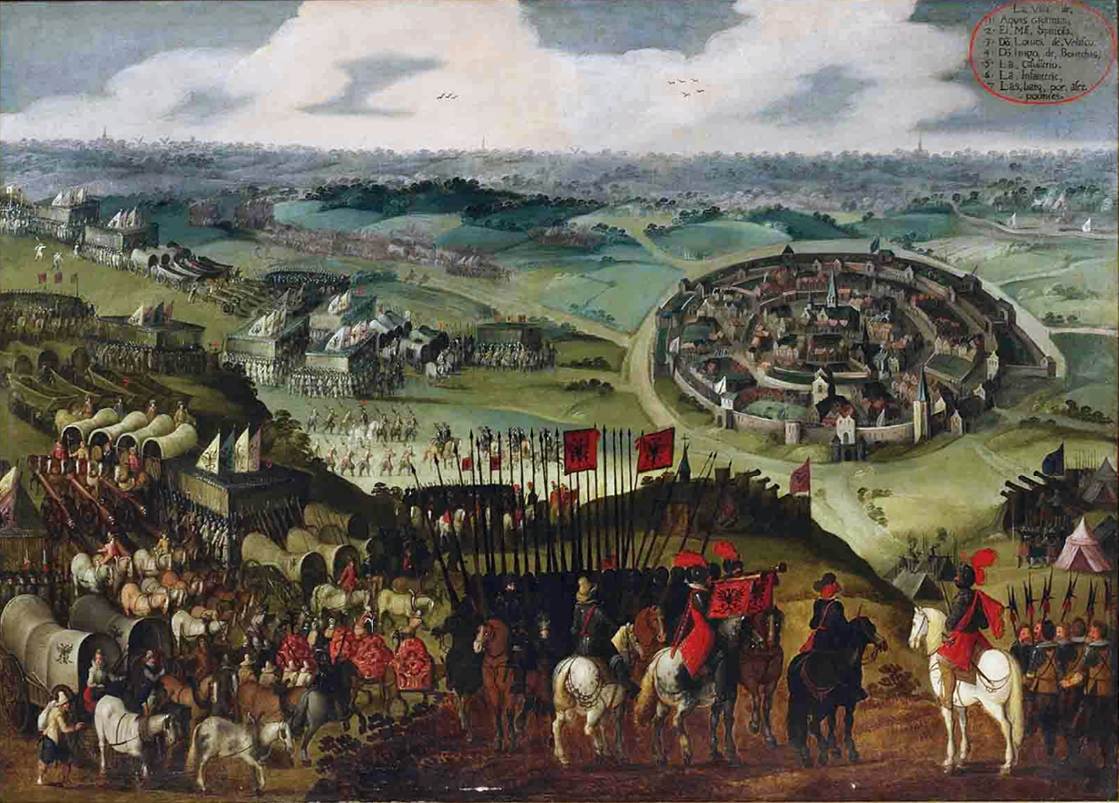
The siege of Aachen by the Spanish Army of Flanders under Ambrogio Spinola in 1614

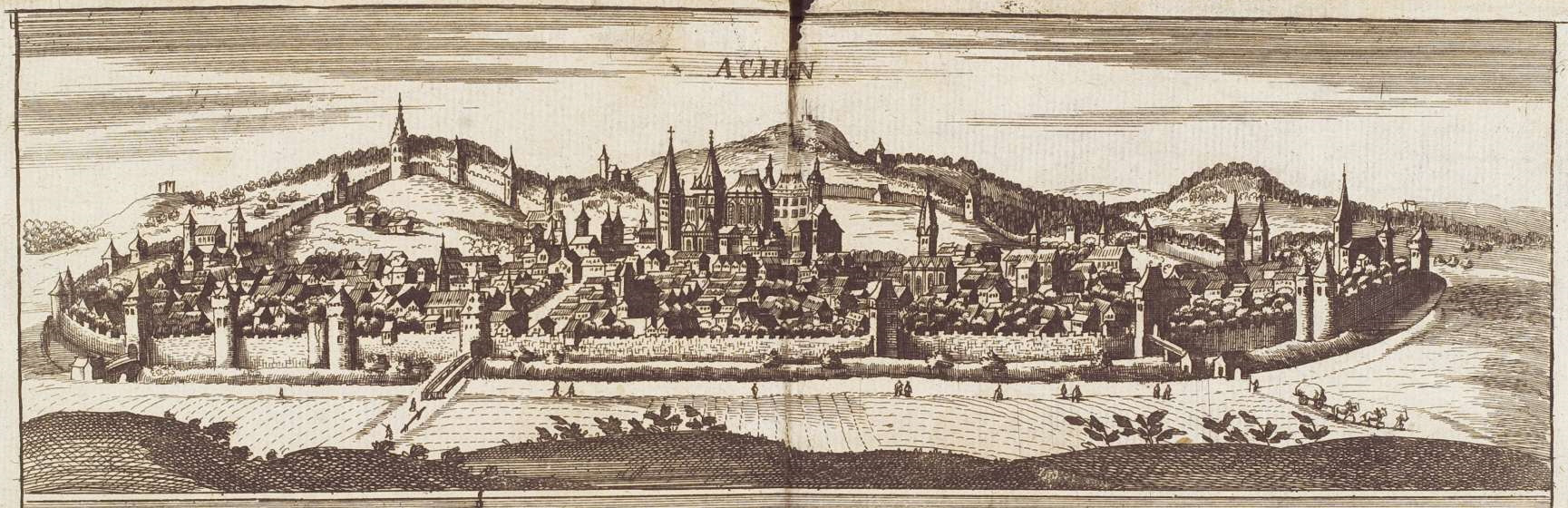
View of Aachen in 1690

In 1598, following the invasion of Spanish troops from the Netherlands, Rudolf deposed all Protestant office holders in Aachen and went as far as expelling them from the city. From the early 16th century, Aachen started to lose its power and influence. First the coronations of emperors were moved from Aachen to Frankfurt. 1614 Aachen became theatre of the Siege of Aachen (1614) within the War of the Jülich Succession. Although religious changes were forced several times in Aachen and Protestant communities were banned, hardly any fighting took place during the Thirty Years' War.

The religious wars had been followed by the great fire of 1656. After the destruction of most of the city in 1656, the rebuilding was mostly in the Baroque style. The decline of Aachen culminated in 1794, when the French, led by General Charles Dumouriez, occupied Aachen. The area of Aachen had been scene of battles within the Flanders Campaign in autumn 1794: Battle of Ourthe, Battle of Aldenhoven, Siege of Maastricht.

In 1542, the Dutch humanist and physician Francis Fabricius published his study of the health benefits of the hot springs in Aachen. By the middle of the 17th century, the city had developed a considerable reputation as a spa, although this was in part because Aachen was then – and remained well into the 19th and early 20th century – a place of high-level prostitution. Traces of this hidden agenda of the city's history are found in the 18th-century guidebooks to Aachen as well as to the other spas.

The main indication for visiting patients, ironically, was syphilis; only by the end of the 19th century had rheumatism become the most important object of cures at Aachen and Burtscheid.

Aachen was chosen as the site of several important congresses and peace treaties: the first congress of Aachen (often referred to as the Congress of Aix-la-Chapelle in English) on 2 May 1668, leading to the First Treaty of Aachen in the same year which ended the War of Devolution. The second congress ended with the second treaty in 1748, ending the War of the Austrian Succession. In 1789, there was a constitutional crisis in the Aachen government, and in 1794 Aachen lost its status as a free imperial city.

In 1629, the Aachen Jewish community was expelled from the city. In 1667, six Jews were allowed to return. Most of the Aachen Jewish community settled in Burtscheid. As recently as the late 18th century the Abbess of Burtscheid was still prevented from building a road linking her territory to the neighbouring estates of the duke of Jülich; the city of Aachen deployed its handful of soldiers to chase away road-diggers.

=== 19th century ===
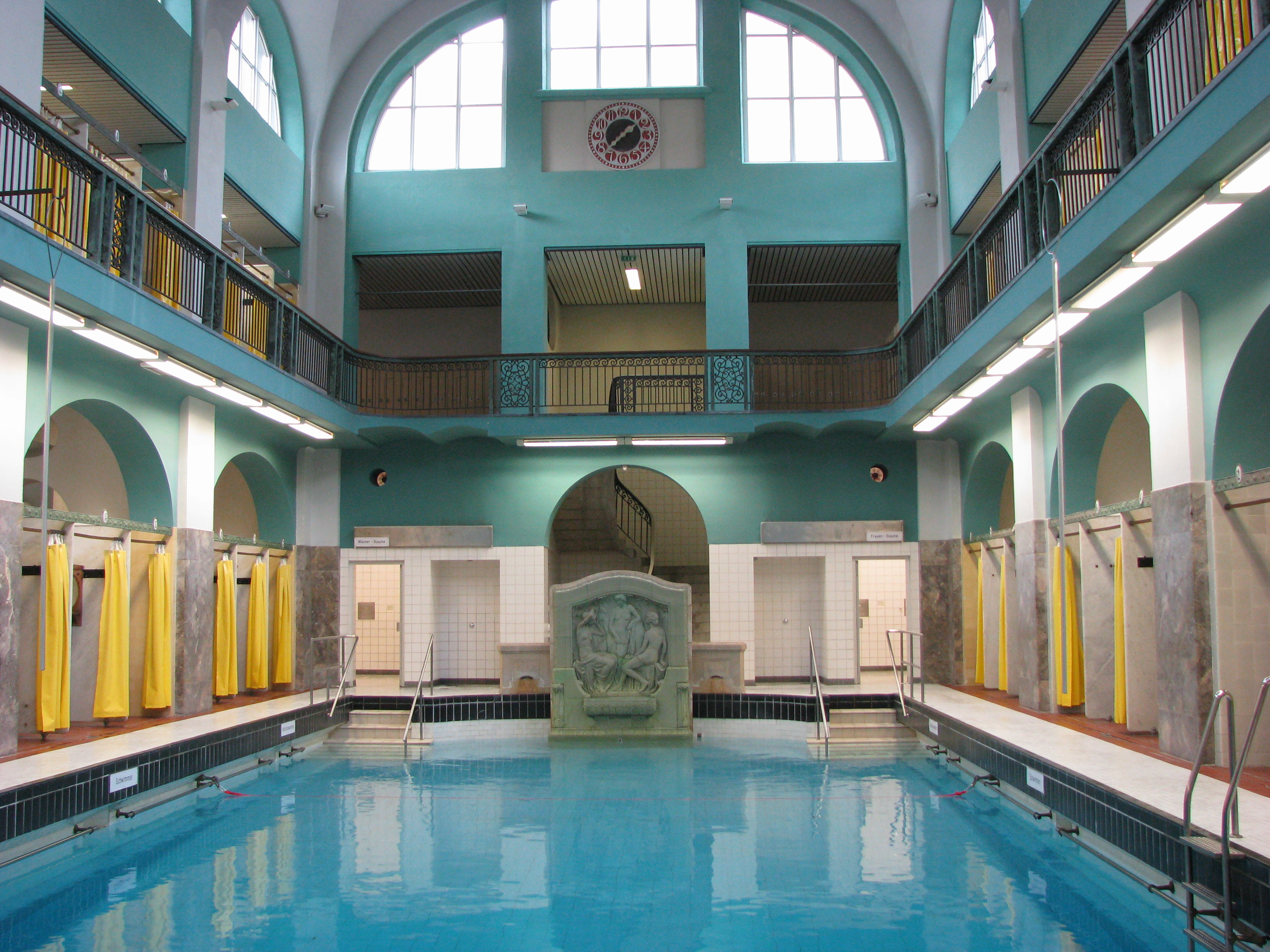
The modern Elisabethhalle pool

On 9 February 1801, the Peace of Lunéville removed the ownership of Aachen and the entire "left bank" of the Rhine from Germany (the Holy Roman Empire) and granted it to France. In 1815, control of the town was passed to the Kingdom of Prussia through an agreement reached by the Congress of Vienna. The third congress took place in 1818, to decide the fate of occupied Napoleonic France.

By the middle of the 19th century, industrialisation had swept away most of the city's medieval rules of production and commerce, although the remains of the city's medieval constitution were kept in place until 1801, when Aachen became the "chef-lieu du département de la Roer" in Napoleon's First French Empire. The current territory of Aachen belonged entirely to the Arrondissement d'Aix-la-Chapelle. In 1815, after the Second Treaty of Paris, finishing the Napoleonic Wars, the Kingdom of Prussia took over within the new German Confederation. The city was one of its most socially and politically backward centres until the end of the 19th century. The Kingdom of Prussia created the "Regierungsbezirk Aachen" (governmental district) and integrated it into the Prussian province Grand Duchy of the Lower Rhine, from 1822 the Rhine Province. By 1880 the population was 80,000. Starting in 1838, the railway from Cologne to Belgium passed through Aachen. By "Gesetz betreffend die Vereinigung der Stadtgemeinde Burtscheid mit der Stadtgemeinde Aachen vom 29. März 1897 nebst Vertrag" Aachen and Burtscheid merged 1897. The city suffered extreme overcrowding and deplorable sanitary conditions until 1875, when the medieval fortifications were abandoned as a limit to building and new, better housing was built in the east of the city, where sanitary drainage was easiest. In December 1880, the Aachen tramway network was opened, and in 1895 it was electrified. In the 19th century and up to the 1930s, the city was important in the production of railway locomotives and carriages, iron, pins, needles, buttons, tobacco, woollen goods, and silk goods.

=== 20th century ===
==== Prewar Period ====
Aachen was enlarged 1 April 1906 by "Gesetz betreffend die Vereinigung der Gemeinde Forst mit der Stadtgemeinde Aachen vom 31. März 1906 nebst Vertrag" by incorporation of Forst.

==== World War I, Interwar Period, World War II ====
Films shot on 13, 14 and 15 October 1944 in Aachen by US forces

The Belgium Campaign within World War I started in Aachen.

After World War I, Aachen was occupied by the Entente until 1930, along with the rest of German territory west of the Rhine. Aachen was one of the locations involved in the Rhenish Republic. On 21 October 1923, an armed mob took over the city hall. Similar actions took place in Mönchengladbach, Duisburg, and Krefeld. This republic lasted about a year.

During the interwar period, Aachen was assigned some areas of the former district of Eupen.

Also the Western Campaign of World War II started nearby Aachen with the Battle of Maastricht.

Aachen was heavily damaged during World War II. Philip W. Blood has recorded more than 120 air strikes on Aachen between 1940 and 1944. He isolated the air raid of 12-13 July 1943 as having destroyed the old Baroque heart of the city. Subsequent raids between September 1943 and May 1944 systematically ‘paralysed’ the city and rendered the administration untenable.The civilian evacuations had started in 1941 and the last major evacuation took place in September/October 1944.

In autumn 1944 Aachen and its surroundings were reached by the Western Allied Siegfried Line campaign.

The US report imply the city and its fortified surroundings were besieged from 12 September to 21 October 1944 by the US 1st Infantry Division with the 3rd Armored Division assisting from the south. Around 13 October the US 2nd Armored Division, coming from the north, got as close as Würselen, while the 30th Infantry Division completed the encirclement of Aachen on 16 October 1944. Blood has argued there is siege myth. With reinforcements from the US 28th Infantry Division the battle continued involving direct assaults through the heavily defended city, which forced the German garrison to surrender on 21 October 1944.

Aachen was the first German city to be captured by the Western Allies, and some surviving civilians welcomed the Americans as liberators. despite this welcome, they were rounded up and placed in a camp under harsh and restrictive conditions.

The City was already destroyed in the bombing by over 60-80%, the American artillery fire and tactical bombing by the USAAF added to the destruction. Many buildings including medieval churches were gutted by fire and all roofless. The wooden beams of the Rathaus (city hall) were severely damaged in the fire raid of 1943 and was propped up on temporary buttresses. The Aachen Cathedral was largely unscathed due to the prompt action of a church official employing teenagers to guard the cathedral roof from incendiaries. The first Allied-appointed mayor, Franz Oppenhoff, was assassinated by an SS commando unit.

==== Expulsion of Aachen Jews ====
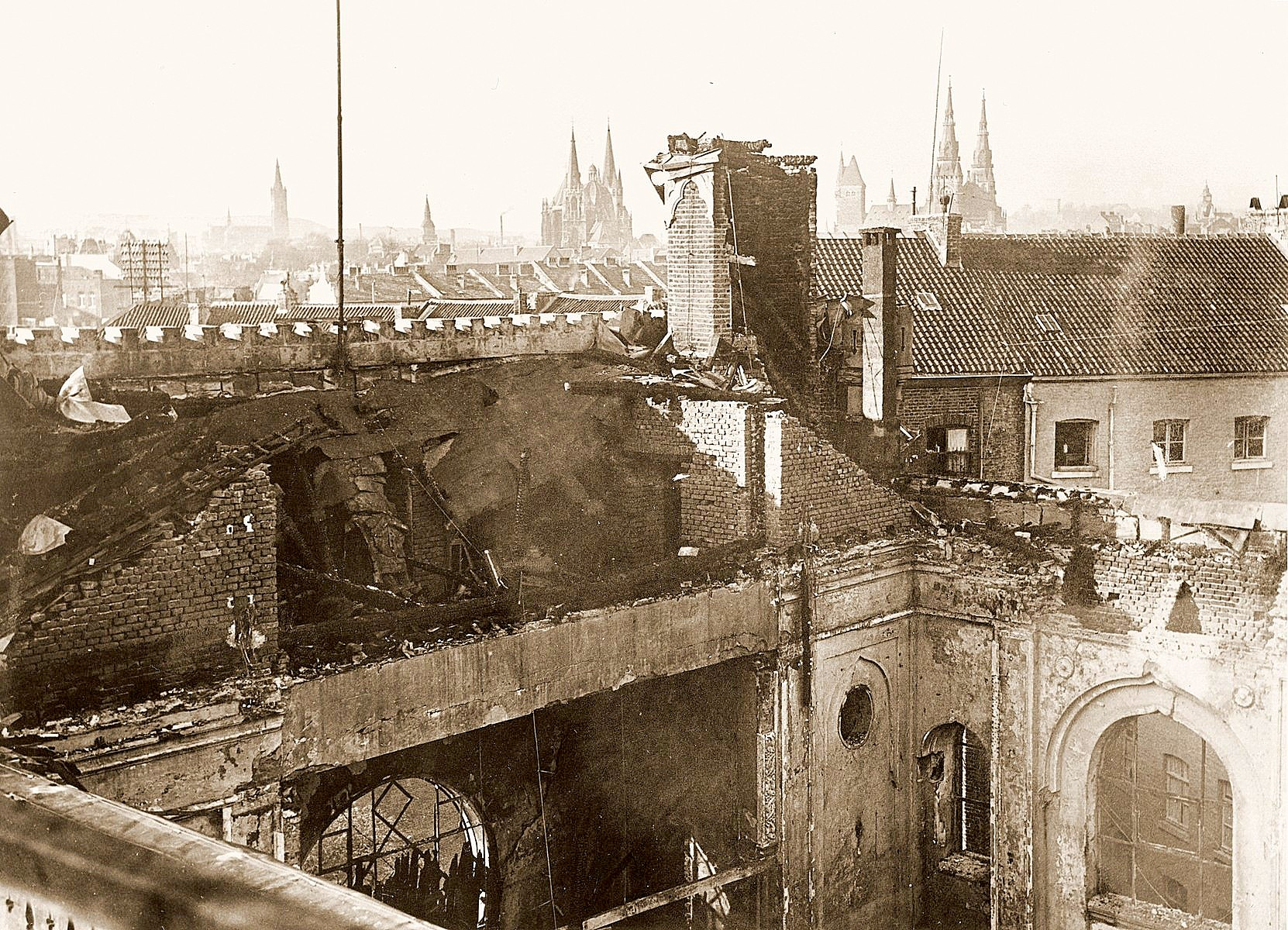
View of the Old Synagogue after its destruction on Kristallnacht, November 1938

On 16 May 1815, the Jewish community of the city offered an homage in its synagogue to the Prussian king, Friedrich Wilhelm III. In 1862, a large synagogue was built, later called the Old Synagogue. By 1933, 1,345 Jews lived in the city. On Kristallnacht in 1938, the synagogue was destroyed. By the onset of World War II in 1939, many Jews had emigrated or were arrested, and only 782 remained in the city. At the end of the war in 1945, only 62 Jews lived in the city. According to Blood, the British conducted investigations of the pre-war crimes and set up the first UN Crimes Against Humanity trial. As of 2003, 1,434 Jews were again living in Aachen.

==== Postwar periods ====
Subsequent to the German surrender finishing the Battle of Aachen 21 October 1944, the Supreme Headquarters Allied Expeditionary Force acted as military government. Aachen within the northern part of Rhine Province became part of British occupation zone in Germany. Aachen also belonged to the British zone under Belgian control. By Ordinance No. 46, British Military Government created the "Land Nordrhein/Westfalen", including the "Regierungsbezirk Aachen", 23 August 1946. 23 May 1949 Aachen became part of the Federal Republic of Germany. With the Aachen Law of 1971, Aachen was merged with Kornelimünster, Brand, Walheim, Laurensberg, Richterich, Haaren, Eilendorf. After the abolition of the Aachen governmental district, August 1972, Aachen became part of the Cologne governmental district.

=== 21st century ===
The city of Aachen has developed into a technology hub as a by-product of hosting one of the leading universities of technology in Germany with the RWTH Aachen (Rheinisch-Westfälische Technische Hochschule), known especially for mechanical engineering, automotive and manufacturing technology as well as for its research and academic hospital Klinikum Aachen, one of the largest medical facilities in Europe.

== Geography ==
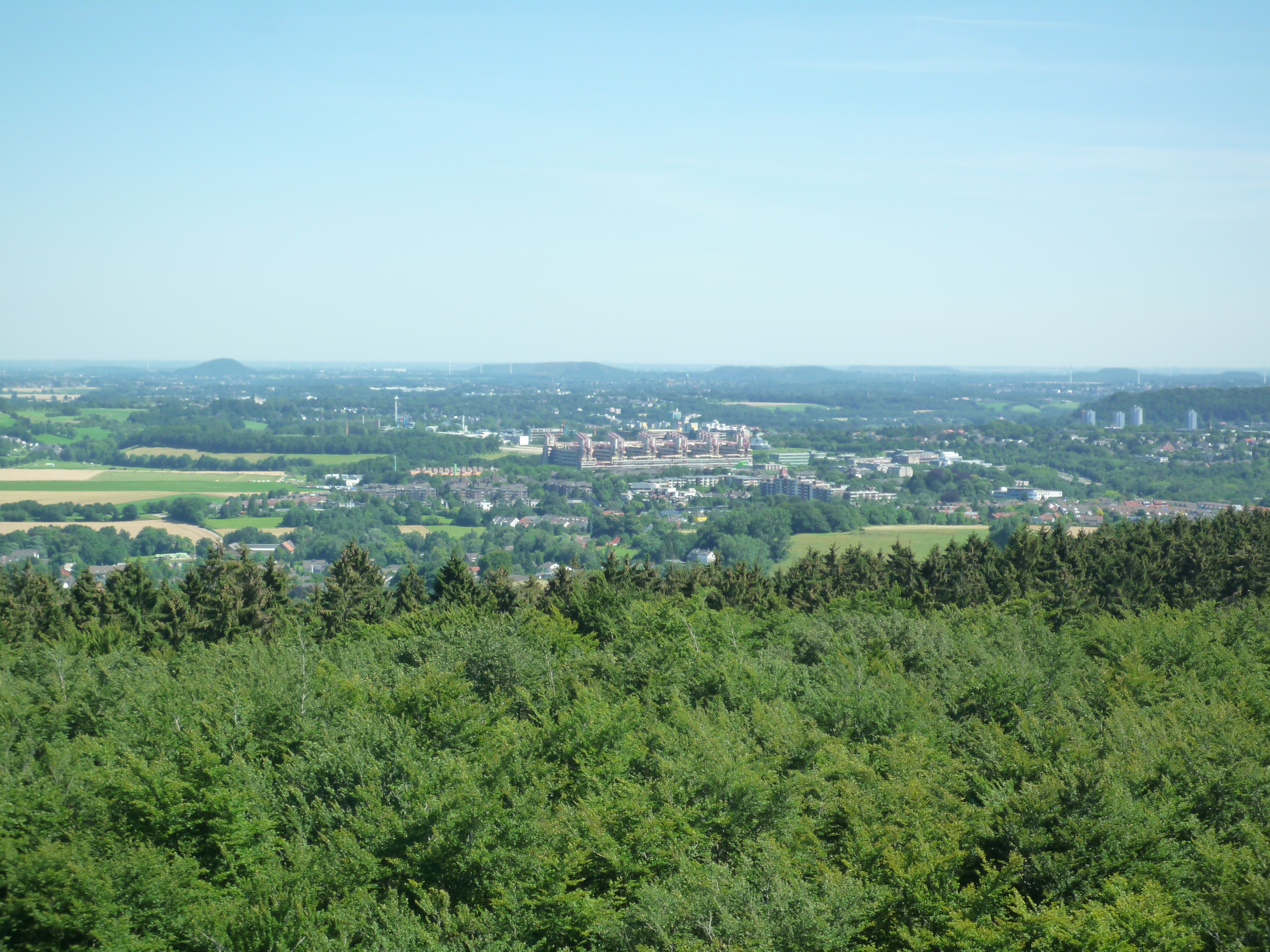
View towards Aachen at the foothills of the High Fens, with the university hospital visible, from the Vaalserberg, the highest elevation in Aachen and of the European part of the Netherlands.

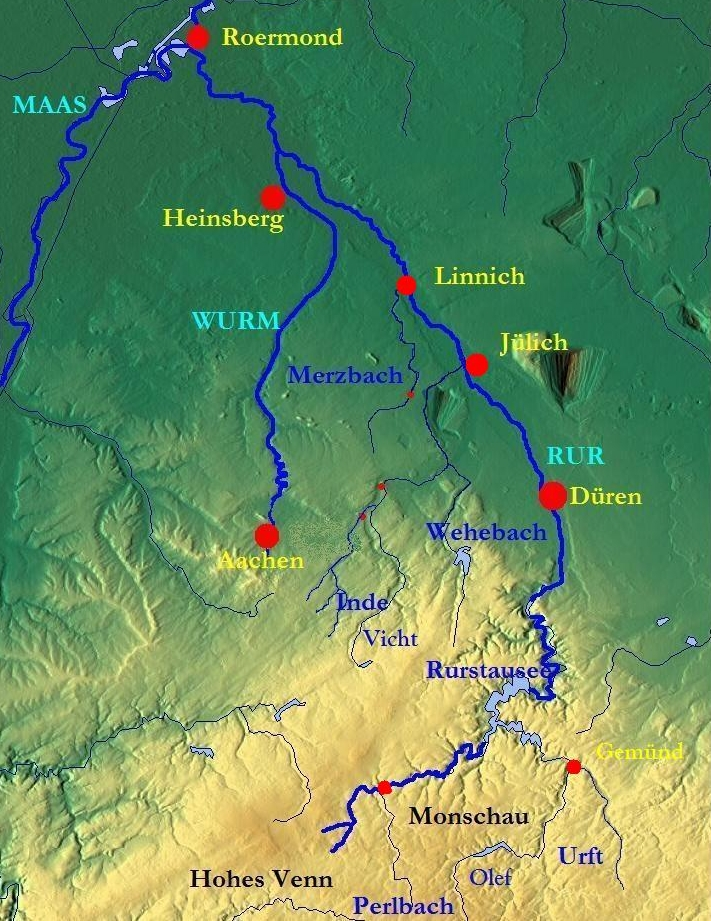
Physiogeographical location of Aachen

Aachen is located in the middle of the Meuse–Rhine Euroregion, close to the border tripoint of Germany, the Netherlands, and Belgium. The town of Vaals in the Netherlands lies nearby at about 6 km (4 mi) from Aachen's city centre, while the Dutch city of Heerlen and Eupen, the capital of the German-speaking Community of Belgium, are both located about 20 km (12 mi) from Aachen city centre. Aachen lies near the head of the open valley of the Wurm (which today flows through the city in canalised form), part of the larger basin of the Meuse, and about 30 km (19 mi) north of the High Fens, which form the northern edge of the Eifel uplands of the Rhenish Massif.

The maximum dimensions of the city's territory are 21.6 km (13 3/8 mi) from north to south, and 17.2 km (10 3/4 mi) from east to west. The city limits are 87.7 km (54 1/2 mi) long, of which 23.8 km (14 3/4 mi) border Belgium and 21.8 km (13 1/2 mi) the Netherlands. The highest point in Aachen, located in the far southeast of the city, lies at an elevation of 410 m (1,350 ft) above sea level. The lowest point, in the north, and on the border with the Netherlands, is at 125 m (410 ft).

=== Climate ===
As the westernmost city in Germany (and close to the Low Countries), Aachen and the surrounding area belongs to a temperate climate zone (Cfb), with humid weather, mild winters, and warm summers. Because of its location north of the Eifel and the High Fens and its subsequent prevailing westerly weather patterns, rainfall in Aachen (on average 805 mm/year) is comparatively higher than, for example, in Bonn (with 669 mm/year). Another factor in the local weather forces of Aachen is the occurrence of Foehn winds on the southerly air currents, which results from the city's geographic location on the northern edge of the Eifel.

Because the city is surrounded by hills, it suffers from inversion-related smog. Some areas of the city have become urban heat islands as a result of poor heat exchange, both because of the area's natural geography and from human activity. The city's numerous cold air corridors, which are slated to remain as free as possible from new construction, therefore play an important role in the urban climate of Aachen.

The January average is 3.0 °C (37 °F), while the July average is 18.5 °C (65 °F). Precipitation is almost evenly spread throughout the year.

The city's oceanic climate provides comparably mild winters: While Aachen falls within the coldest extents covered by USDA plant hardiness zone 8b in the 1991–2020 period, having an average yearly minimum of −9.22 °C (15.4 °F), the Canadian city of Regina, Saskatchewan which is located at a similar latitude but at the heart of the North American landmass, far away from the sea's moderating effects, is classified as being in zone 3a.

In the 1991–2020 period, the record latest freeze (at 2 m above ground) of spring occurred on 28 April and the record first fall freeze on 13 October. The average last freeze date for the 1991–2020 period is 6 April, though it varies significantly from year to year and by location (note that the climate station was relocated in 2011).

The Aachen weather station has recorded the following extreme values:

- Highest Temperature 38.6 °C (101.5 °F) on 25 July 2019.
- Warmest Minimum 24.5 °C (76.1 °F) on 29 July 1947.
- Coldest Maximum −12.8 °C (9.0 °F) on 22 January 1940.
- Lowest Temperature −20.4 °C (−4.7 °F) on 11 January 1945.
- Highest Daily Precipitation 98.7 mm (3.89 in) on 14 July 2021.
- Wettest Month 232.2 mm (9.14 in) in July 2021.
- Wettest Year 1,121.1 mm (44.14 in) in 1966.
- Driest Year 530.5 mm (20.89 in) in 1959.
- Earliest Snowfall: 4 November 1941.
- Latest Snowfall: 30 April 1938.
- Longest annual sunshine: 2,128.4 hours in 2003.
- Shortest annual sunshine: 1,277.4 hours in 1981.

Climate data for Aachen (1991–2020 normals, extremes 1891–present (Note: Temperature data for Aachen have been recorded since 1891. The weather station data used from 1 January 1891 to 31 March 2011 came from Aachen weather station, and temperature data from 1 April 2011 to the present are from Aachen-Orsbach.))
Month	Jan	Feb	Mar	Apr	May	Jun	Jul	Aug	Sep	Oct	Nov	Dec	Year
Record high °C (°F)	16.2 (61.2)	20.5 (68.9)	24.5 (76.1)	30.0 (86.0)	34.2 (93.6)	36.6 (97.9)	38.6 (101.5)	37.2 (99.0)	34.3 (93.7)	26.9 (80.4)	22.1 (71.8)	17.6 (63.7)	38.6 (101.5)
Mean maximum °C (°F)	12.5 (54.5)	13.9 (57.0)	18.5 (65.3)	23.3 (73.9)	26.8 (80.2)	30.4 (86.7)	32.4 (90.3)	31.9 (89.4)	27.0 (80.6)	22.5 (72.5)	16.5 (61.7)	12.7 (54.9)	34.1 (93.4)
Mean daily maximum °C (°F)	5.7 (42.3)	6.8 (44.2)	10.6 (51.1)	14.7 (58.5)	18.5 (65.3)	21.4 (70.5)	23.7 (74.7)	23.3 (73.9)	19.4 (66.9)	14.8 (58.6)	9.4 (48.9)	5.6 (42.1)	14.5 (58.1)
Daily mean °C (°F)	3.2 (37.8)	3.8 (38.8)	6.6 (43.9)	10.0 (50.0)	13.8 (56.8)	16.6 (61.9)	18.7 (65.7)	18.3 (64.9)	14.8 (58.6)	10.8 (51.4)	6.7 (44.1)	3.3 (37.9)	10.5 (50.9)
Mean daily minimum °C (°F)	0.8 (33.4)	1.2 (34.2)	3.4 (38.1)	5.8 (42.4)	9.3 (48.7)	12.0 (53.6)	14.4 (57.9)	14.0 (57.2)	11.2 (52.2)	7.7 (45.9)	4.4 (39.9)	1.2 (34.2)	7.1 (44.8)
Mean minimum °C (°F)	−6.9 (19.6)	−5.8 (21.6)	−2.9 (26.8)	−0.6 (30.9)	3.0 (37.4)	6.8 (44.2)	9.4 (48.9)	9.4 (48.9)	6.2 (43.2)	1.2 (34.2)	−1.9 (28.6)	−5.1 (22.8)	−9.2 (15.4)
Record low °C (°F)	−20.4 (−4.7)	−20.2 (−4.4)	−11.9 (10.6)	−4.8 (23.4)	−1.3 (29.7)	1.8 (35.2)	5.8 (42.4)	3.4 (38.1)	0.0 (32.0)	−5.7 (21.7)	−8.9 (16.0)	−16.5 (2.3)	−20.4 (−4.7)
Average precipitation mm (inches)	64.3 (2.53)	63.4 (2.50)	59.3 (2.33)	53.5 (2.11)	65.0 (2.56)	70.0 (2.76)	79.0 (3.11)	80.6 (3.17)	68.1 (2.68)	66.1 (2.60)	66.6 (2.62)	74.4 (2.93)	811.4 (31.94)
Average extreme snow depth cm (inches)	4.6 (1.8)	5.4 (2.1)	1.7 (0.7)	0.4 (0.2)	0 (0)	0 (0)	0 (0)	0 (0)	0 (0)	0 (0)	0.7 (0.3)	4.3 (1.7)	9.8 (3.9)
Average precipitation days (≥ 0.1 mm)	17.0	16.5	16.4	13.5	15.9	14.6	15.3	14.4	14.1	15.1	18.2	18.2	189.6
Average snowy days (≥ 1.0 cm)	5.5	5.1	1.2	0.1	0	0	0	0	0	0	1.1	3.8	17.1
Average relative humidity (%)	82.1	80.1	74.9	68.9	70.3	70.5	70.7	72.1	77.4	80.7	83.7	84.8	76.4
Mean monthly sunshine hours	68.3	75.0	126.2	168.7	194.9	207.9	208.1	196.9	151.3	121.5	68.0	52.5	1,634.3
Source 1: NOAA
Source 2: Data derived from Deutscher Wetterdienst

== Geology ==
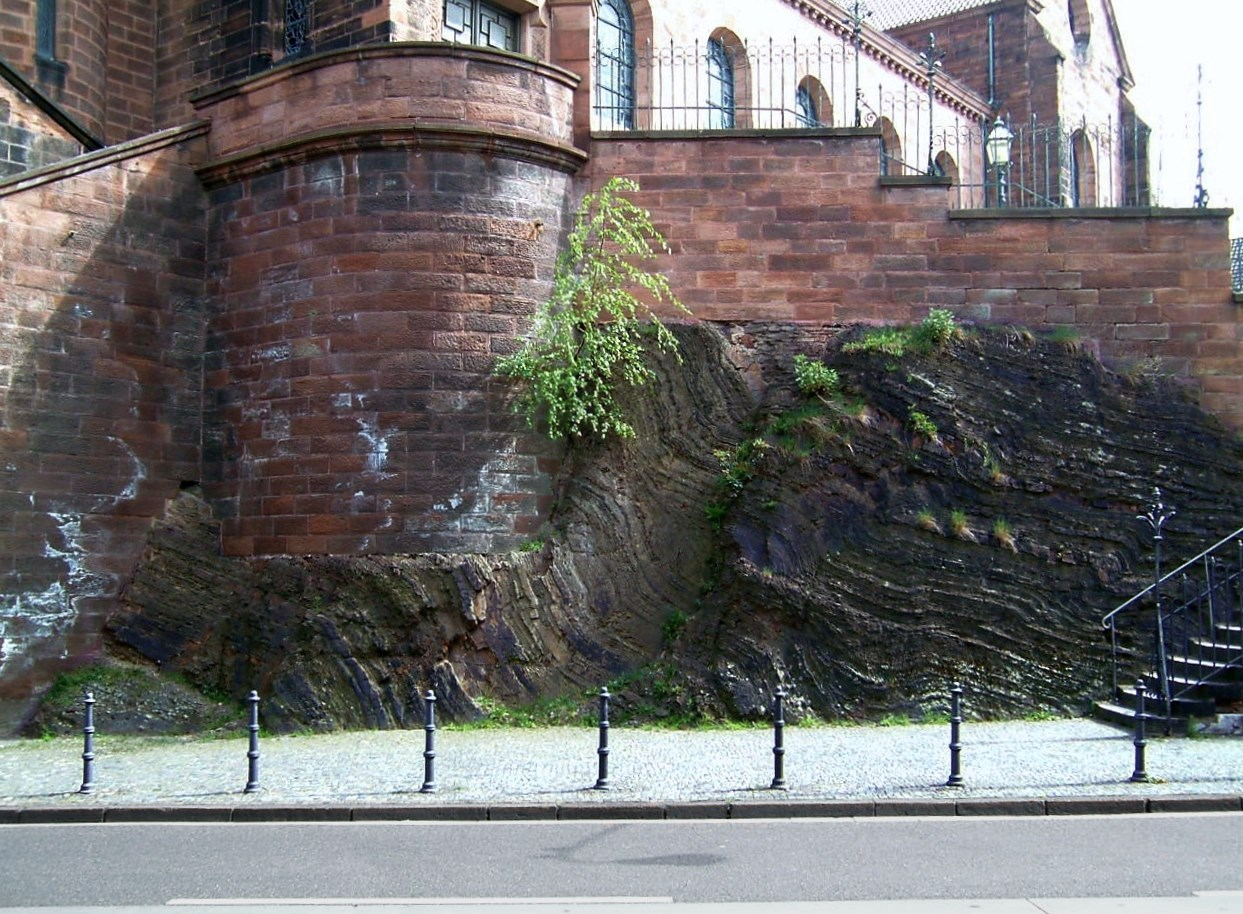
Layered sandstone and claystone formation from the Devonian period below St. Adalbert Church in Aachen

The geology of Aachen is very structurally heterogeneous. The oldest occurring rocks in the area surrounding the city originate from the Devonian period and include carboniferous sandstone, greywacke, claystone and limestone. These formations are part of the Rhenish Massif, north of the High Fens. In the Pennsylvanian subperiod of the Carboniferous geological period, these rock layers were narrowed and folded as a result of the Variscan orogeny. After this event, and over the course of the following 200 million years, this area has been continuously flattened.

During the Cretaceous period, the ocean penetrated the continent from the direction of the North Sea up to the mountainous area near Aachen, bringing with it clay, sand, and chalk deposits. While the clay (which was the basis for a major pottery industry in nearby Raeren) is mostly found in the lower areas of Aachen, the hills of the Aachen Forest and the Lousberg were formed from upper Cretaceous sand and chalk deposits. More recent sedimentation is mainly located in the north and east of Aachen and was formed through Tertiary and Quaternary river and wind activities.

Along the major thrust fault of the Variscan orogeny, there are over 30 thermal springs in Aachen and Burtscheid. Additionally, the subsurface of Aachen is traversed by numerous active faults that belong to the Rurgraben fault system, which has been responsible for numerous earthquakes in the past, including the 1756 Düren earthquake and the 1992 Roermond earthquake, which was the strongest earthquake ever recorded in the Netherlands.

== Demographics ==
Historical population

Year	Pop.	±% p.a.
1965	226,244	—
1970	233,645	+0.65%
1975	242,464	+0.74%
1980	243,957	+0.12%
1985	238,614	−0.44%
1990	241,861	+0.27%
1995	247,923	+0.50%

Year	Pop.	±% p.a.
2000	244,386	−0.29%
2005	258,208	+1.11%
2010	258,664	+0.04%
2015	245,885	−1.01%
2020	248,878	+0.24%
2025	263,703	+1.16%

Source: Landesdatabank Nordrhein-Westfalen

Largest groups of foreign residents
Nationality	Population (30 June 2024)
Turkey	6,745
China	4,365
Ukraine	3,998
Syria	3,751
India	3,662
Romania	2,369
Bulgaria	1,786
Romania	1,836
Poland	1,745
Greece	1,542
Morocco	1,495

Aachen had 245,885 inhabitants as of 31 December 2015, of whom 118,272 were female, and 127,613 were male.

At the end of 2009, the foreign-born residents of Aachen made up 13.6 percent of the total population. A significant portion of foreign residents are students at the RWTH Aachen University.

Age distribution of Aachen's population next to Germany's (2014)

=== Dialect ===
Aachen is at the western end of the Benrath line that divides High German to the south from the rest of the West Germanic speech area to the north. Aachen's local dialect is called Öcher Platt and belongs to Ripuarian.

== Boroughs ==
The city is divided into seven administrative districts, or boroughs, each with its own district council, district leader, and district authority. The councils are elected locally by those who live within the district, and these districts are further subdivided into smaller sections for statistical purposes, with each sub-district named by a two-digit number.

The districts of Aachen, including their constituent statistical districts, are:

- Aachen-Mitte: 10 Markt, 13 Theater, 14 Lindenplatz, 15 St. Jakob, 16 Westpark, 17 Hanbruch, 18 Hörn, 21 Ponttor, 22 Hansemannplatz, 23 Soers, 24 Jülicher Straße, 25 Kalkofen, 31 Kaiserplatz, 32 Adalbertsteinweg, 33 Panneschopp, 34 Rothe Erde, 35 Trierer Straße, 36 Frankenberg, 37 Forst, 41 Beverau, 42 Burtscheid Kurgarten, 43 Burtscheid Abbey, 46 Burtscheid Steinebrück, 47 Marschiertor, 48 Hangeweiher
- Brand: 51 Brand
- Eilendorf: 52 Eilendorf
- Haaren: 53 Haaren (including Verlautenheide)
- Kornelimünster/Walheim: 61 Kornelimünster, 62 Oberforstbach, 63 Walheim
- Laurensberg: 64 Vaalserquartier, 65 Laurensberg
- Richterich: 88 Richterich

Regardless of official statistical designations, there are 50 neighbourhoods and communities within Aachen, here arranged by district:

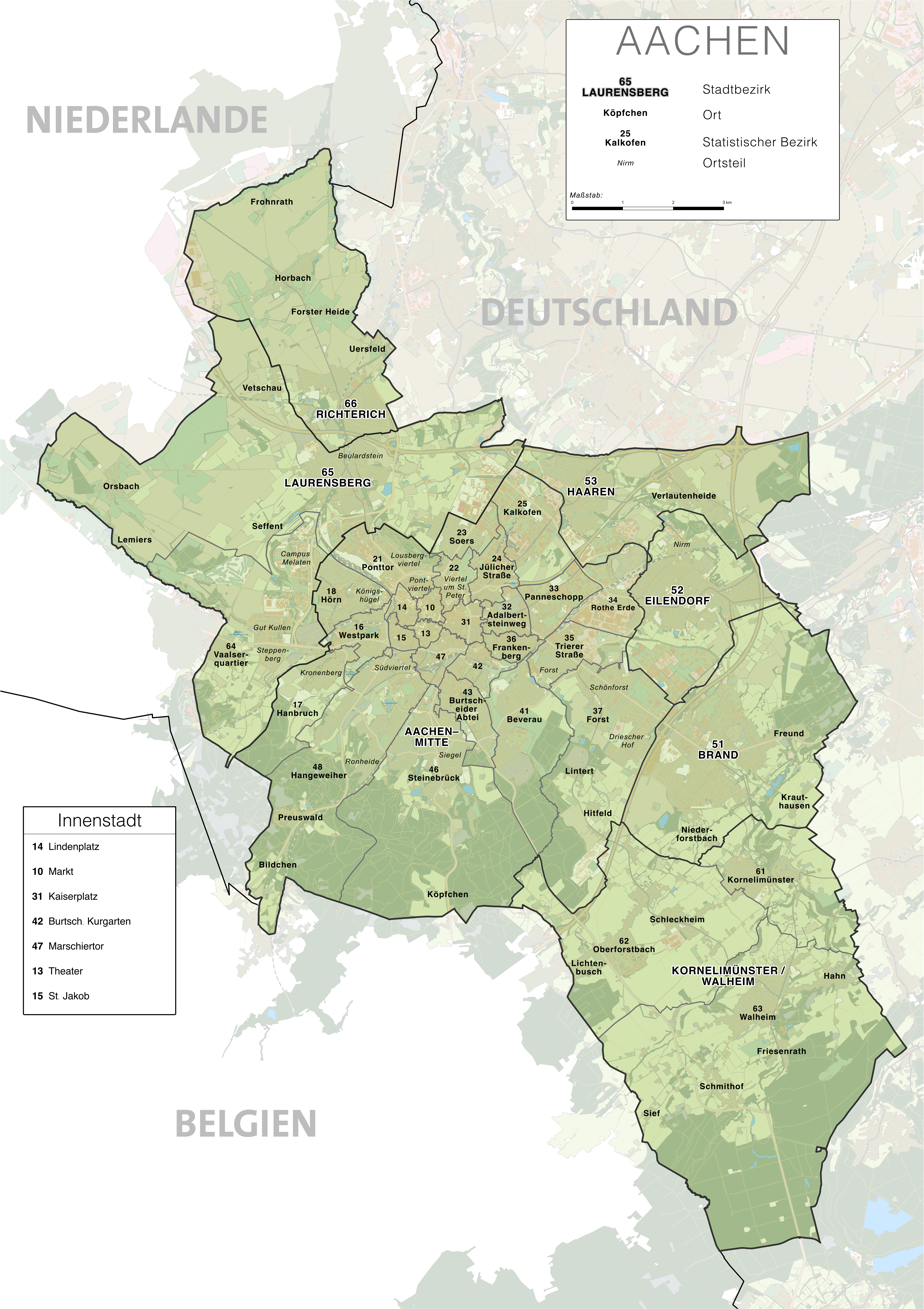
Aachen districts and quarters

- Aachen-Mitte: Beverau, Bildchen, Burtscheid, Forst, Frankenberg, Grüne Eiche, Hörn, Lintert, Pontviertel, Preuswald, Ronheide, Rosviertel, Rothe Erde, Stadtmitte, Steinebrück, West
- Brand: Brand, Eich, Freund, Hitfeld, Niederforstbach
- Eilendorf: Eilendorf, Nirm
- Haaren: Haaren, Hüls, Verlautenheide
- Kornelimünster/Walheim: Friesenrath, Hahn, Kitzenhaus, Kornelimünster, Krauthausen, Lichtenbusch, Nütheim, Oberforstbach, Sief, Schleckheim, Schmithof, Walheim
- Laurensberg: Gut Kullen, Kronenberg, Laurensberg, Lemiers, Melaten, Orsbach, Seffent, Soers, Steppenberg, Vaalserquartier, Vetschau
- Richterich: Horbach, Huf, Richterich

=== Neighbouring communities ===
The following cities and communities border Aachen, clockwise from the northwest: Herzogenrath, Würselen, Eschweiler, Stolberg and Roetgen (which are all in the district of Aachen); Raeren, Kelmis and Plombières (Liège Province in Belgium) as well as Vaals, Gulpen-Wittem, Simpelveld, Heerlen and Kerkrade (all in Limburg Province in the Netherlands).

== Politics ==
=== Mayor ===
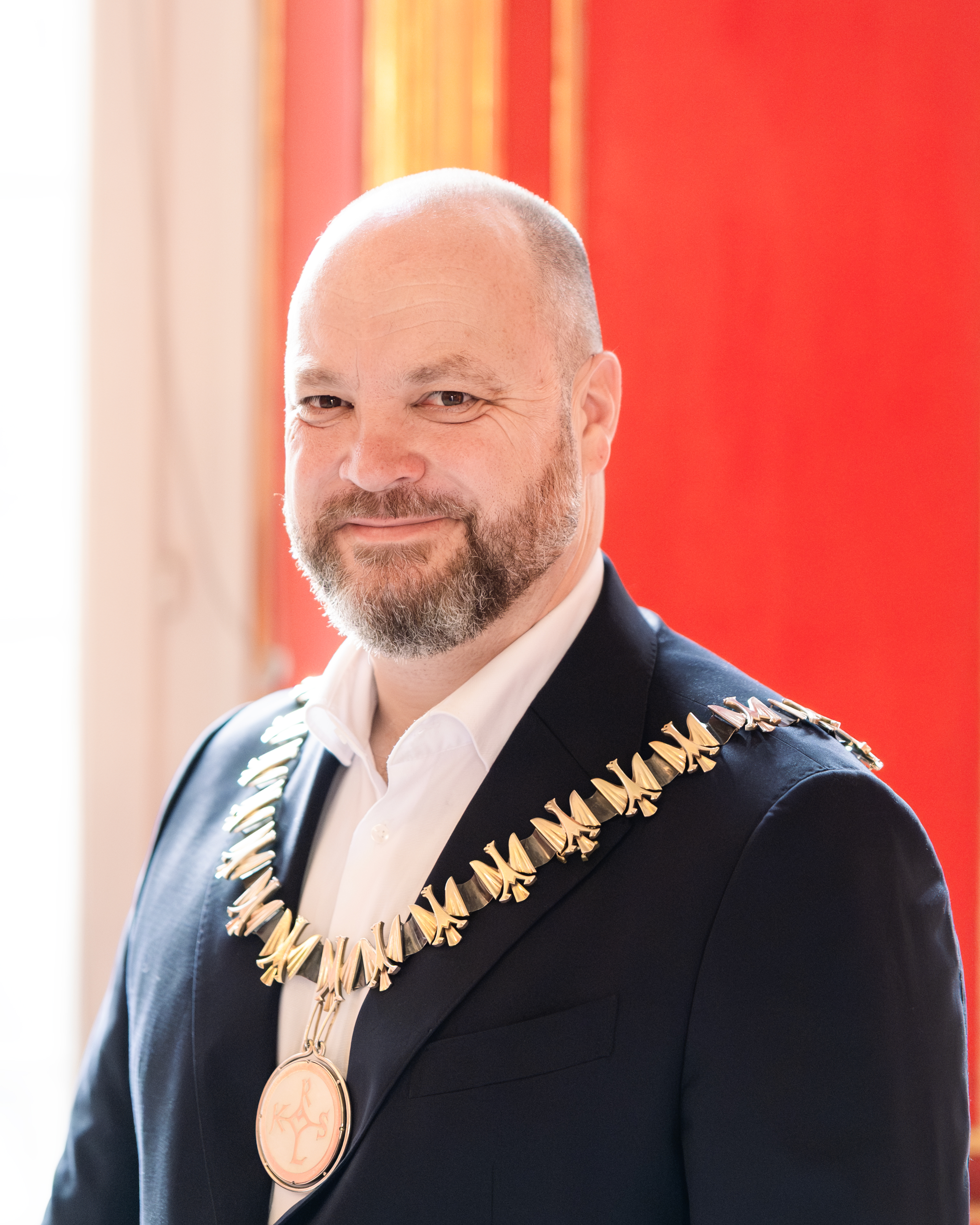
Michael Ziemons (CDU) 2025

The current mayor of Aachen is Michael Ziemons of the CDU, who was elected in 2025. The most recent mayoral election was held on 14 September 2025, with a runoff held on 28 September, and the results were as follows:

Candidate	Party	First round		Second round	
Candidate	Party	Votes	%	Votes	%
Michael Ziemons	Christian Democratic Union	43,860	40.6	50,692	56.0
Sibylle Keupen	Alliance 90/The Greens	35,587	32.9	39,781	44.0
Michael Servos	Social Democratic Party	13,213	12.2		
Ellen Begolli	The Left	4,146	3.8		
Kirill Karasev	Sahra Wagenknecht Alliance	3,253	3.0		
Wulf Pabst	Free Democratic Party	2,262	2.1		
Alexandra Radermacher	Volt Germany	1,593	1.5		
Jörg Polzin	Independent	1,553	1.4		
Ute Haupts	Independent Voters' Association Aachen	1,519	1.4		
Xenia Lehmann	Die PARTEI	1,189	1.1		
Valid votes		108,175	99.2	90,473	99.3
Invalid votes		840	0.8	613	0.7
Total		102,818	100.0	91,086	100.0
Electorate/voter turnout		185,023	59.0	184,943	49.3
Source: City of Aachen

=== City council ===
The Aachen city council governs the city alongside the mayor. The most recent city council election was held on 14 September 2025, and the results were as follows:

Party	Votes	%	+/−	Seats	+/−
Christian Democratic Union (CDU)	35,591	32.9	▲8.0	22	▲8
Alliance 90/The Greens (Grüne)	30,175	27.9	▼6.2	18	▼2
Social Democratic Party (SPD)	14,525	13.4	▼4.9	9	▼2
Alternative for Germany (AfD)	8,388	7.7	▲4.0	5	▲3
The Left (Die Linke)	8,302	7.7	▲3.1	5	▲2
Volt Germany (Volt)	3,301	3.1	▼0.7	2	±0
Free Democratic Party (FDP)	2,906	2.7	▼2.3	2	▼1
Sahra Wagenknecht Alliance (BSW)	1,888	1.7	New	1	New
Independent Voters' Association Aachen (UWG)	1,792	1.7	▲0.1	1	±0
Die PARTEI (PARTEI)	1,432	1.3	▼0.9	1	±0
Independent Polzin	58	0.1	New	0	New
Valid votes	108,358	99.4			
Invalid votes	656	0.6			
Total	109,014	100.0		66	▲8
Electorate/voter turnout	185,023	58.9	▲5.5		
Source: City of Aachen

== Main sights ==
=== Cathedral ===
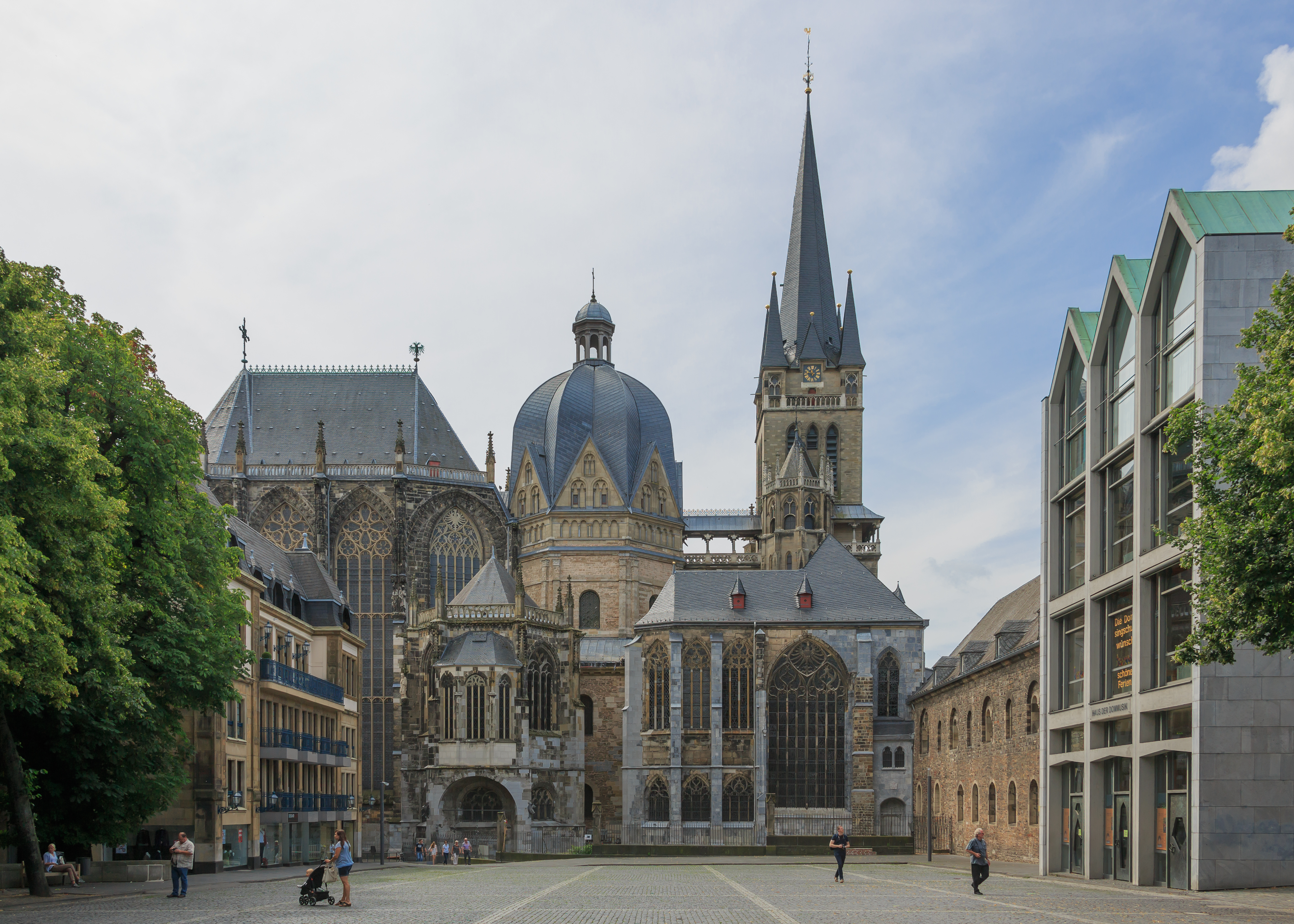
Aachen Cathedral

Aachen Cathedral was erected on the orders of Charlemagne. Construction began c. AD 796, and it was, on completion c. 798, the largest cathedral north of the Alps. It was modelled after the Basilica of San Vitale, in Ravenna, Italy, and was built by Odo of Metz. Charlemagne also desired for the chapel to compete with the Lateran Palace, both in quality and authority. It was originally built in the Carolingian style, including marble covered walls, and mosaic inlay on the dome. On his death, Charlemagne's remains were interred in the cathedral and can be seen there to this day. The cathedral was extended several times in later ages, turning it into a curious and unique mixture of building styles. The throne and gallery portion date from the Ottonian, with portions of the original opus sectile floor still visible. The 13th century saw gables being added to the roof, and after the fire of 1656, the dome was rebuilt. Finally, a choir was added around the start of the 15th century.

After Frederick Barbarossa canonised Charlemagne in 1165 the chapel became a destination for pilgrims. For 600 years, from 936 to 1531, Aachen Cathedral was the church of coronation for 30 German kings and 12 queens. The church built by Charlemagne is still the main attraction of the city. In addition to holding the remains of its founder, it became the burial place of his successor Otto III. In the upper chamber of the gallery, Charlemagne's marble throne is housed. Aachen Cathedral has been designated as a UNESCO World Heritage Site.

Most of the marble and columns used in the construction of the cathedral were brought from Rome and Ravenna, including the sarcophagus in which Charlemagne was eventually laid to rest. A bronze bear from Gaul was placed inside, along with an equestrian statue from Ravenna, believed to be Theodric, in contrast to a wolf and a statue of Marcus Aurelius in the Capitoline. Bronze pieces such as the doors and railings, some of which have survived to present day, were cast in a local foundry. Finally, there is uncertainty surrounding the bronze pine cone in the chapel, and where it was created. Wherever it was made, it was also a parallel to a piece in Rome, this in Old St. Peter's Basilica.

=== Cathedral Treasury ===
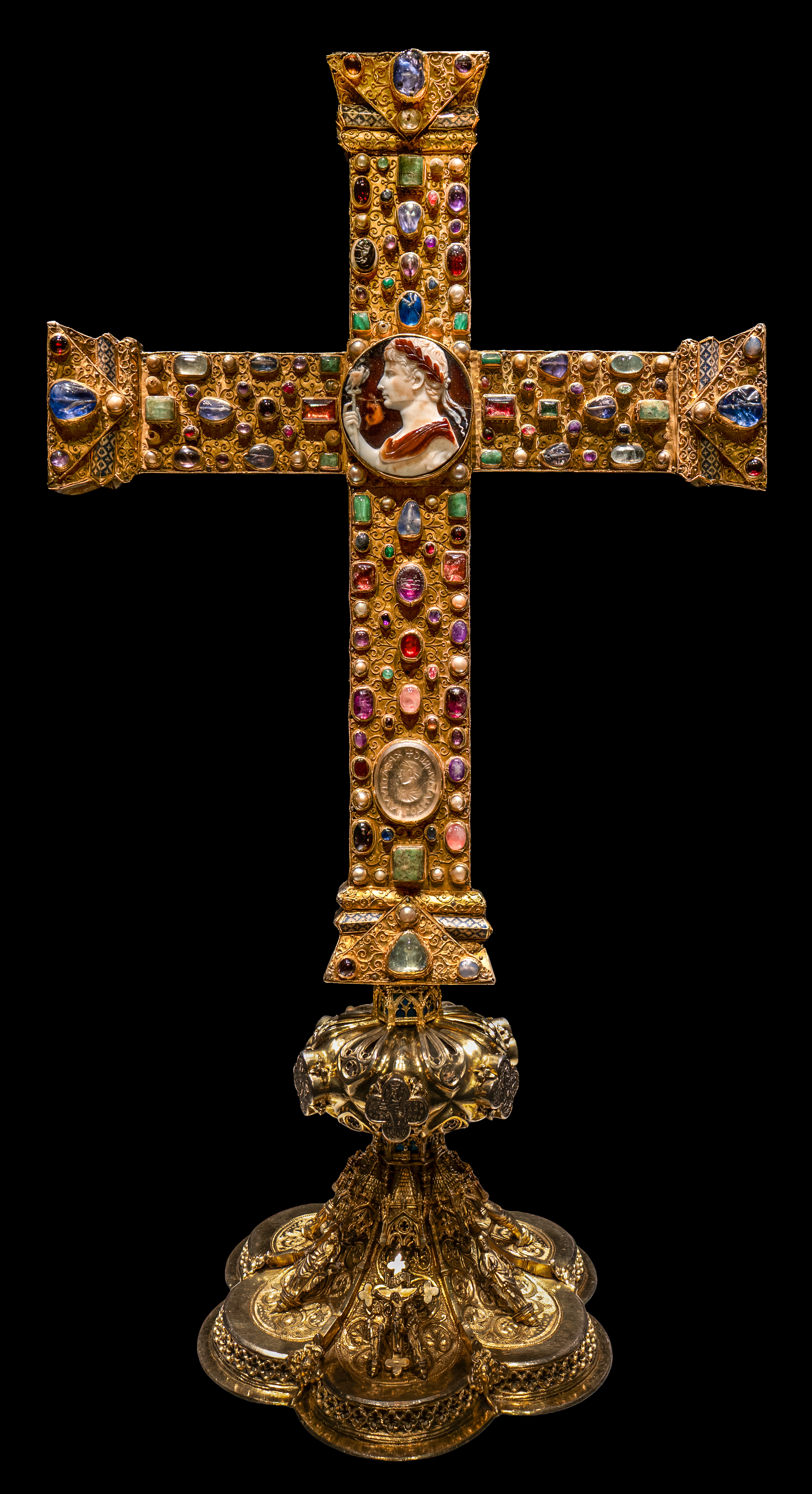
Cross of Lothair, Aachen Cathedral Treasury

Aachen Cathedral Treasury has housed, throughout its history, a collection of liturgical objects. The origin of this church treasure is in dispute as some say Charlemagne himself endowed his chapel with the original collection, while the rest were collected over time. Others say all of the objects were collected over time, from such places as Jerusalem and Constantinople. The location of this treasury has moved over time and was unknown until the 15th century when it was located in the Matthiaskapelle (St. Matthew's Chapel) until 1873, when it was moved to the Karlskapelle (Charles' Chapel). From there it was moved to the Hungarian Chapel in 1881 and in 1931 to its present location next to the Allerseelenkapelle (Poor Souls' Chapel). Only six of the original Carolingian objects have remained, and of those only three are left in Aachen: the Aachen Gospels, a diptych of Christ, and an early Byzantine silk. The Coronation Gospels and a reliquary burse of St. Stephen were moved to Vienna in 1798 and the Talisman of Charlemagne was given as a gift in 1804 to Josephine Bonaparte and subsequently to Rheims Cathedral. 210 documented pieces have been added to the treasury since its inception, typically to receive in return legitimisation of linkage to the heritage of Charlemagne. The Lothar Cross, the Gospels of Otto III and multiple additional Byzantine silks were donated by Otto III. Part of the Pala d'Oro and a covering for the Aachen Gospels were made of gold donated by Henry II. Frederick Barbarossa donated the candelabrum that adorns the dome and also once "crowned" the Shrine of Charlemagne, which was placed underneath in 1215. Charles IV donated a pair of reliquaries. Louis XI gave, in 1475, the crown of Margaret of York, and, in 1481, another arm reliquary of Charlemagne. Maximilian I and Charles V both gave numerous works of art by Hans von Reutlingen. Continuing the tradition, objects continued to be donated until the present, each indicative of the period of its gifting, with the last documented gift being a chalice from 1960 made by Ewald Mataré.

=== Rathaus ===
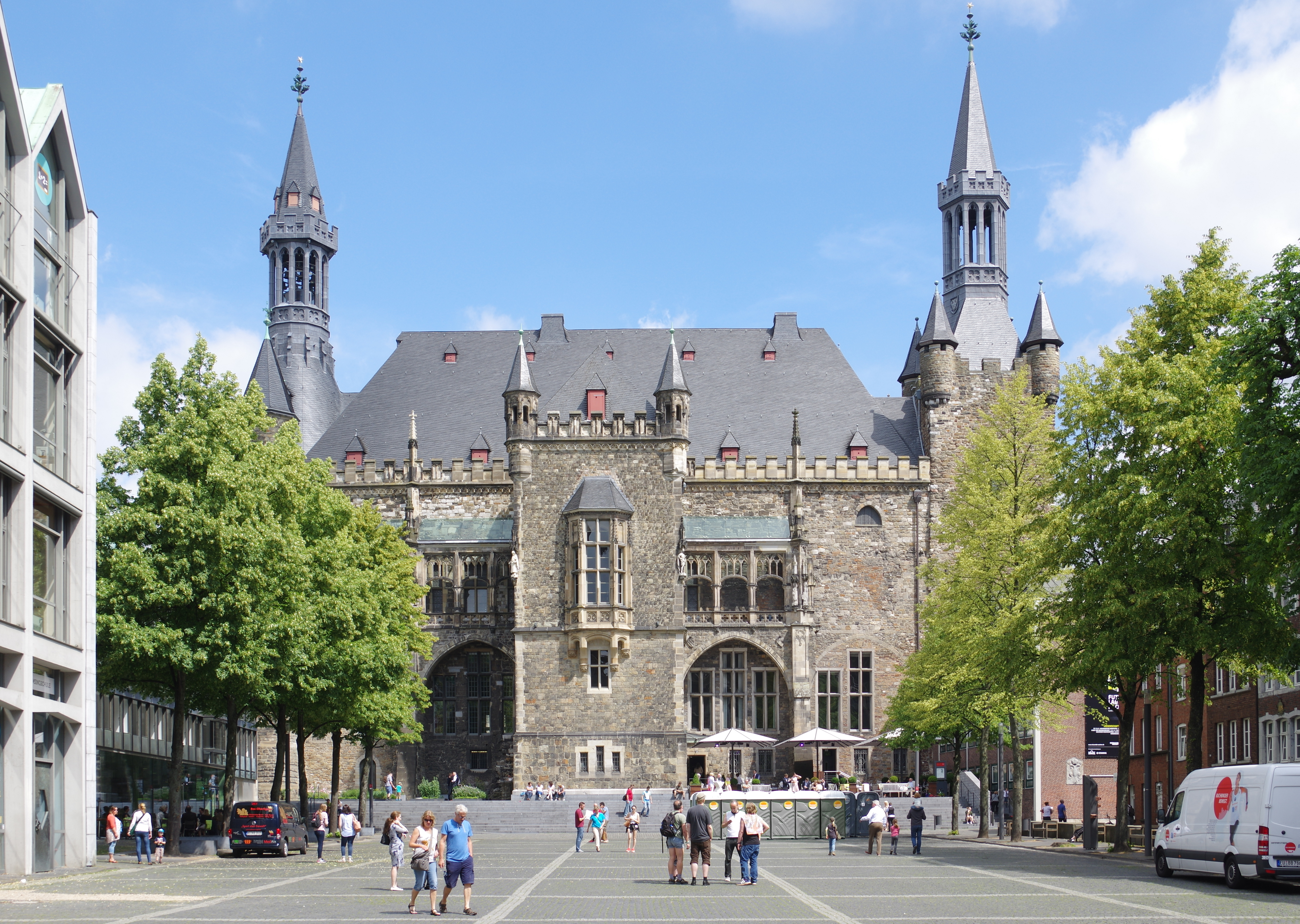
Aachen Town Hall seen from the south

Aachen Town Hall dated from 1330, lies between two central squares, the Markt (marketplace) and the Katschhof (between city hall and cathedral). The coronation hall is on the first floor of the building. Inside one can find five frescoes by the Aachen artist Alfred Rethel which show legendary scenes from the life of Charlemagne, as well as Charlemagne's signature. Also, precious replicas of the Imperial Regalia are kept here.

Since 2009, the city hall has been a station on the Route Charlemagne, a tour programme by which historical sights of Aachen are presented to visitors. At the city hall, a museum exhibition explains the history and art of the building and gives a sense of the historical coronation banquets that took place there. A portrait of Napoleon from 1807 by Louis-André-Gabriel Bouchet and one of his wife Joséphine from 1805 by Robert Lefèvre are viewable as part of the tour.

As before, the city hall is the seat of the mayor of Aachen and of the city council, and annually the Charlemagne Prize is awarded there.

=== Other sights ===
The Grashaus, a late medieval house at the Fischmarkt, is one of the oldest non-religious buildings in central Aachen. It hosted the city archive, and before that, the Grashaus was the city hall until the present building took over this function.

The Elisenbrunnen is one of the most famous sights of Aachen. It is a neo-classical hall covering one of the city's famous fountains. It is just a minute away from the cathedral. Just a few steps in a south-easterly direction lies the 19th-century theatre.

Also of note are two remaining city gates, the Ponttor (Pont gate), 800 metres (1/2 mile) northwest of the cathedral, and the Marschiertor (marching gate), close to the central railway station. There are also a few parts of both medieval city walls left, most of them integrated into more recent buildings, but some others still visible. There are even five towers left, some of which are used for housing.

St. Michael's Church, Aachen was built as a church of the Aachen Jesuit Collegium in 1628. It is attributed to the Rhine mannerism, and a sample of a local Renaissance architecture. The rich façade remained unfinished until 1891, when the architect Peter Friedrich Peters added to it. The church is a Greek Orthodox church today, but the building is used also for concerts because of its good acoustics.

The synagogue in Aachen, which was destroyed on the Night of Broken Glass (Kristallnacht), 9 November 1938, was reinaugurated on 18 May 1995. One of the contributors to the reconstructions of the synagogue was Jürgen Linden, the Lord Mayor of Aachen from 1989 to 2009.

There are numerous other notable churches and monasteries, a few remarkable 17th- and 18th-century buildings in the particular Baroque style typical of the region, a synagogue, a collection of statues and monuments, park areas, cemeteries, among others. Among the museums in the town are the Suermondt-Ludwig Museum, which has a fine sculpture collection and the Aachen Museum of the International Press, which is dedicated to newspapers from the 16th century to the present. The area's industrial history is reflected in dozens of 19th- and early 20th-century manufacturing sites in the city.

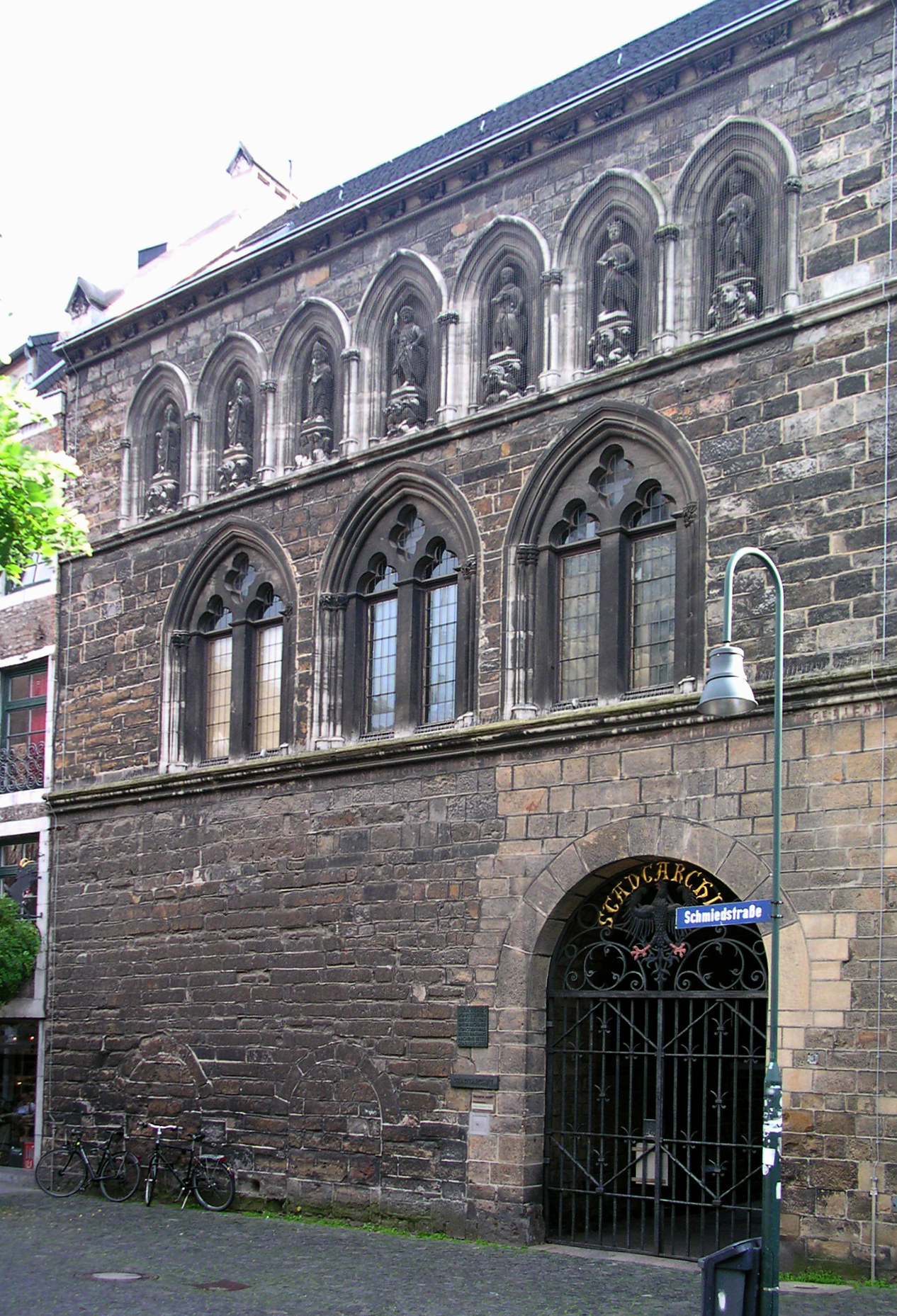
Grashaus

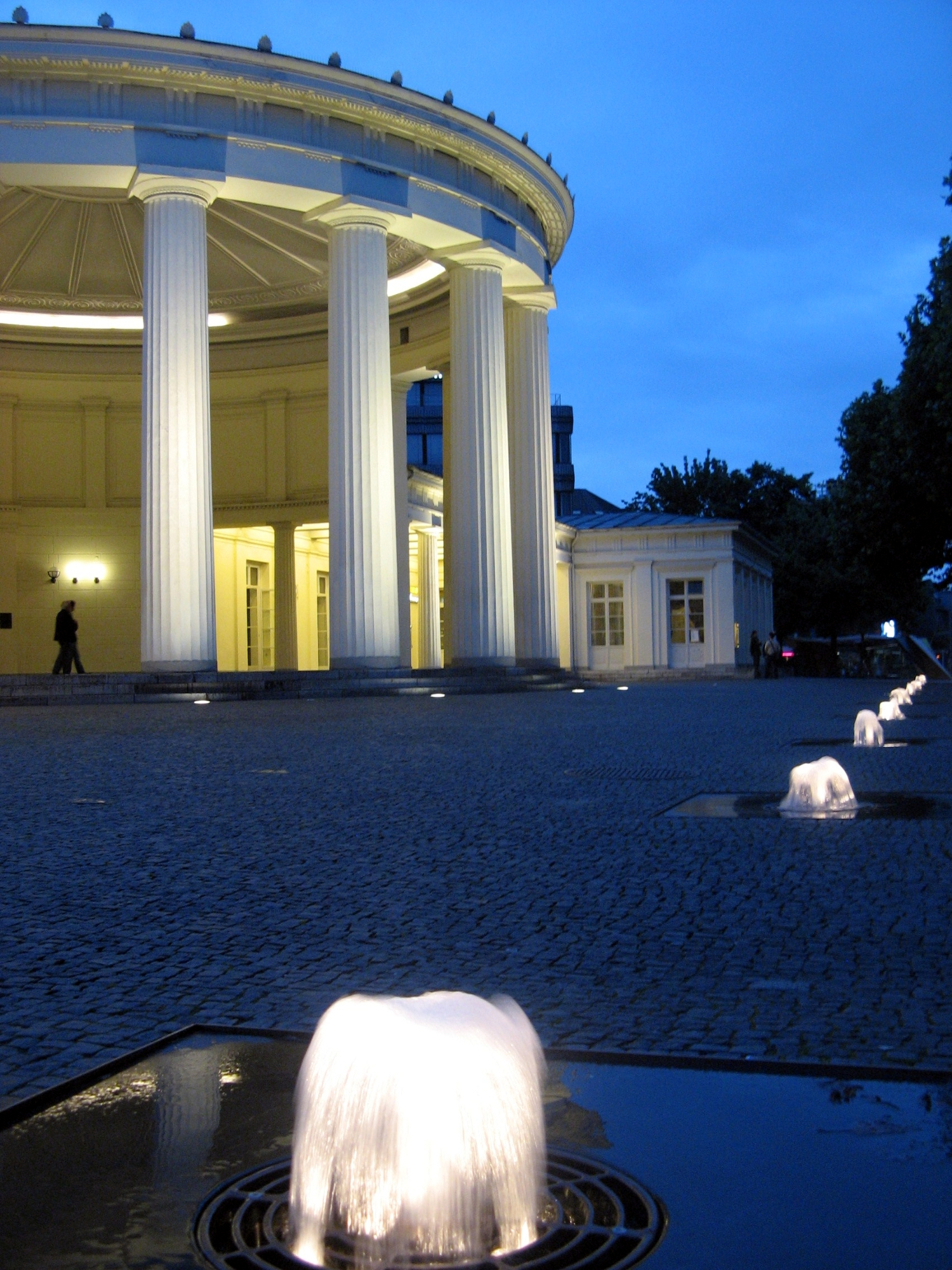
Elisenbrunnen in Aachen

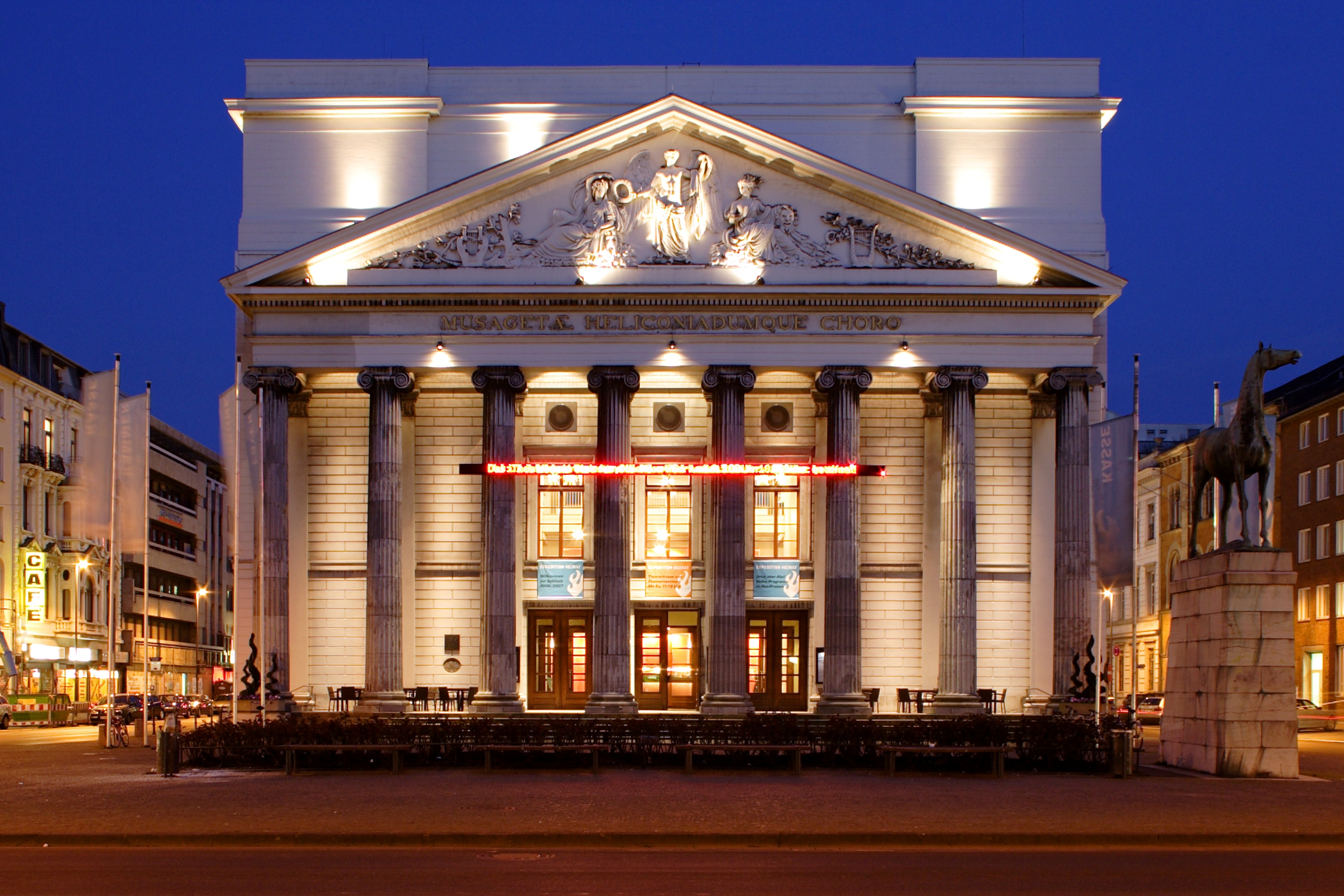
Aachen Theatre

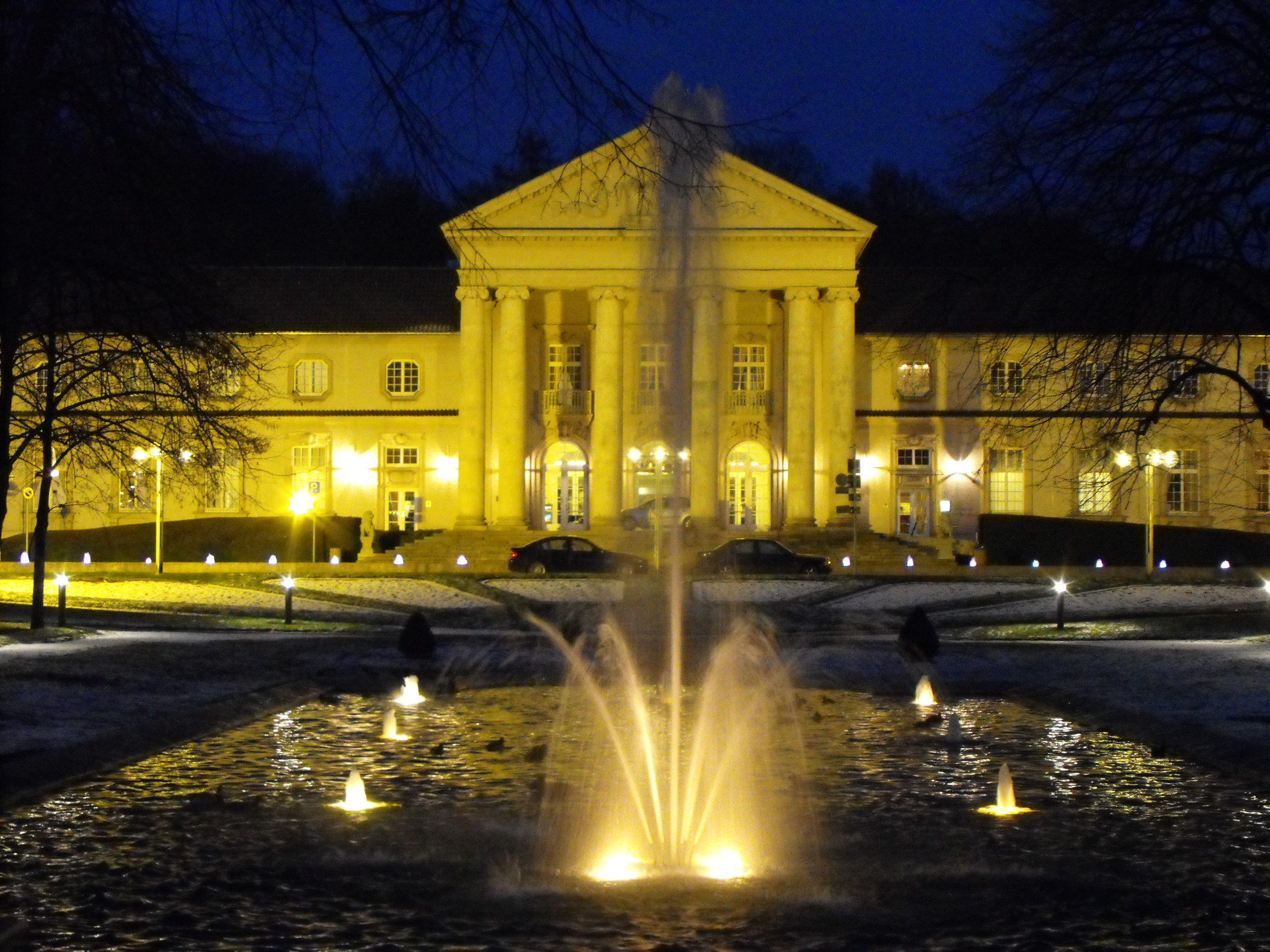
Neues Kurhaus

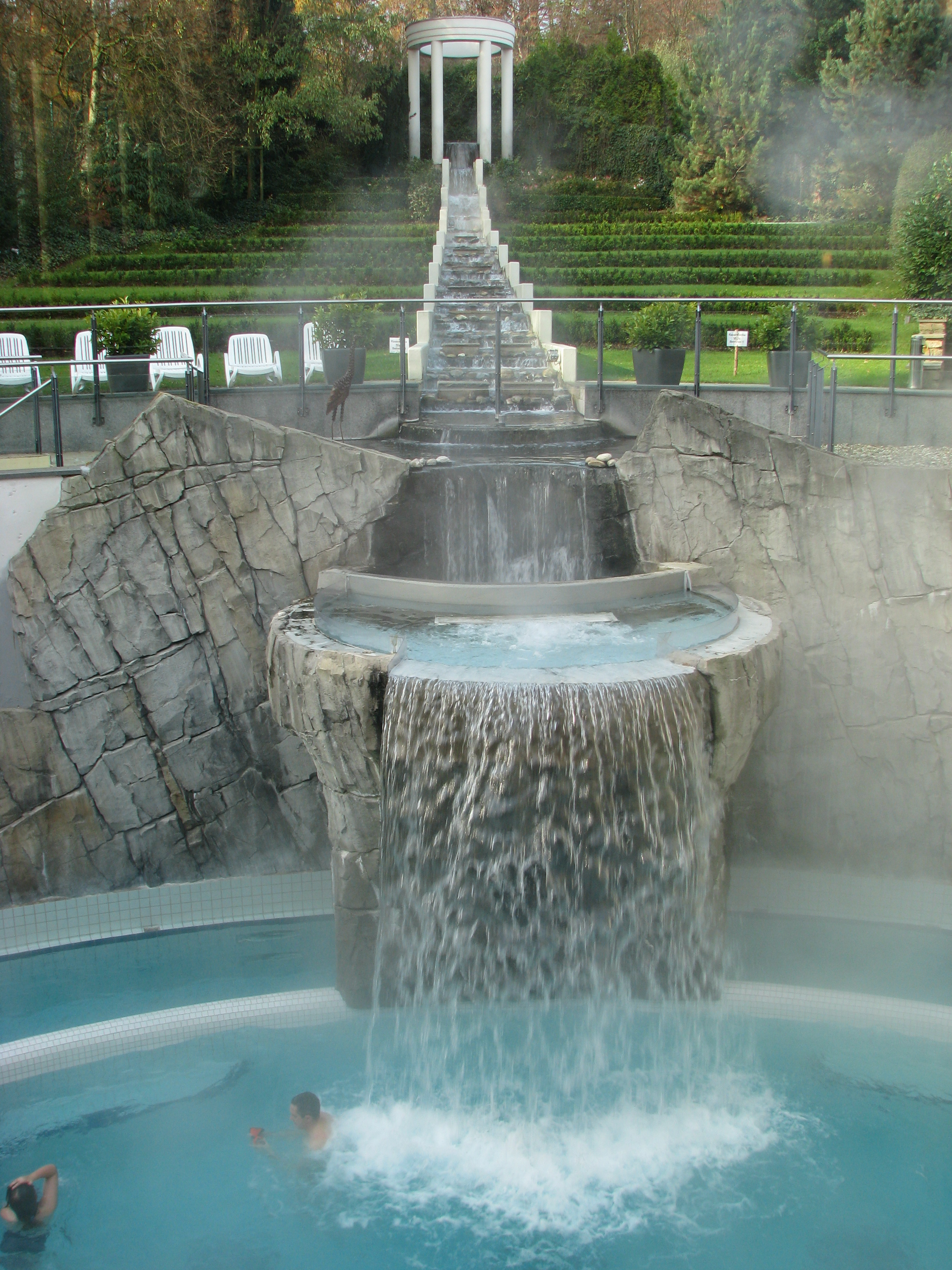
Carolus Thermen, thermal baths named after Charlemagne

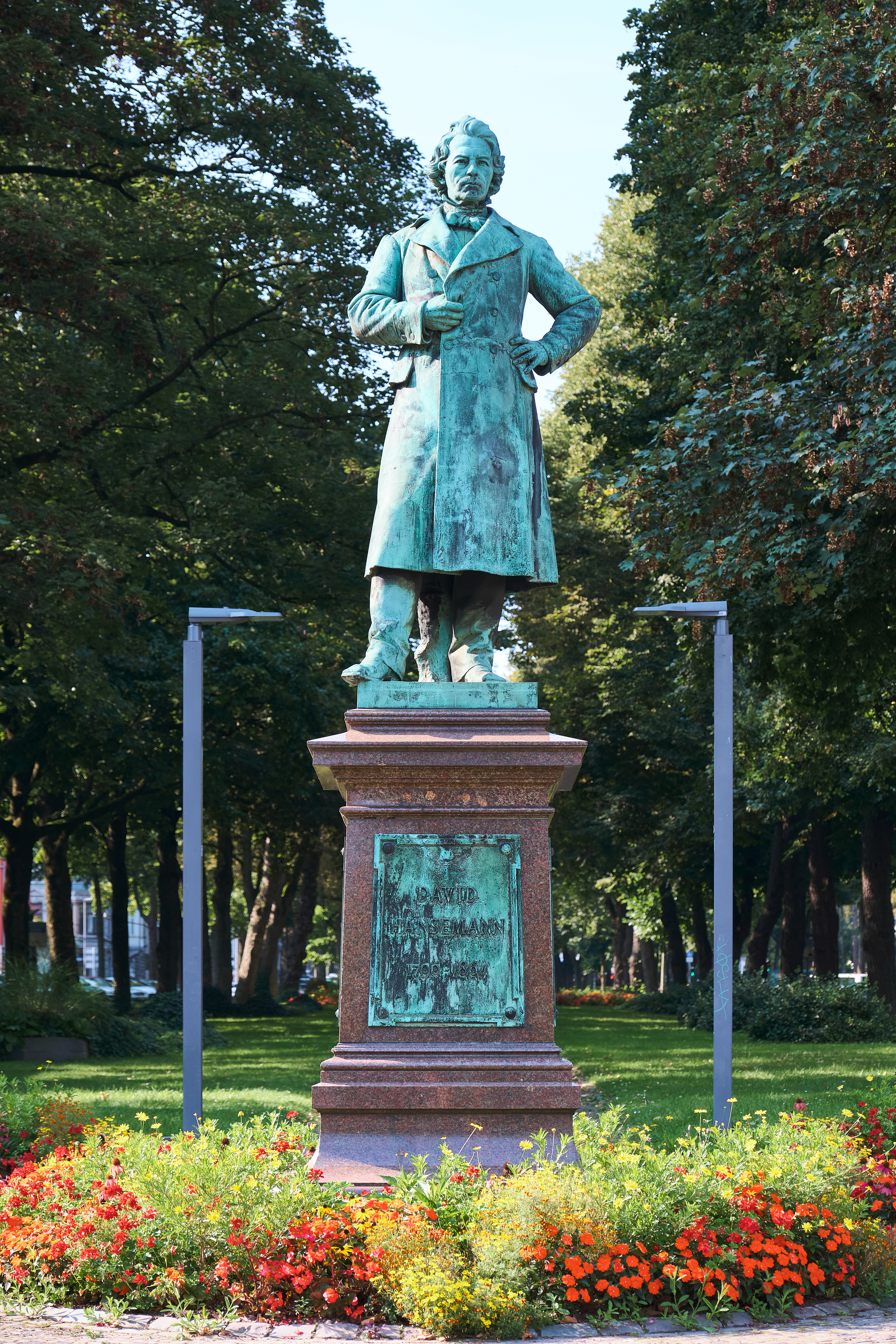
A statue commemorating David Hansemann

== Economy ==
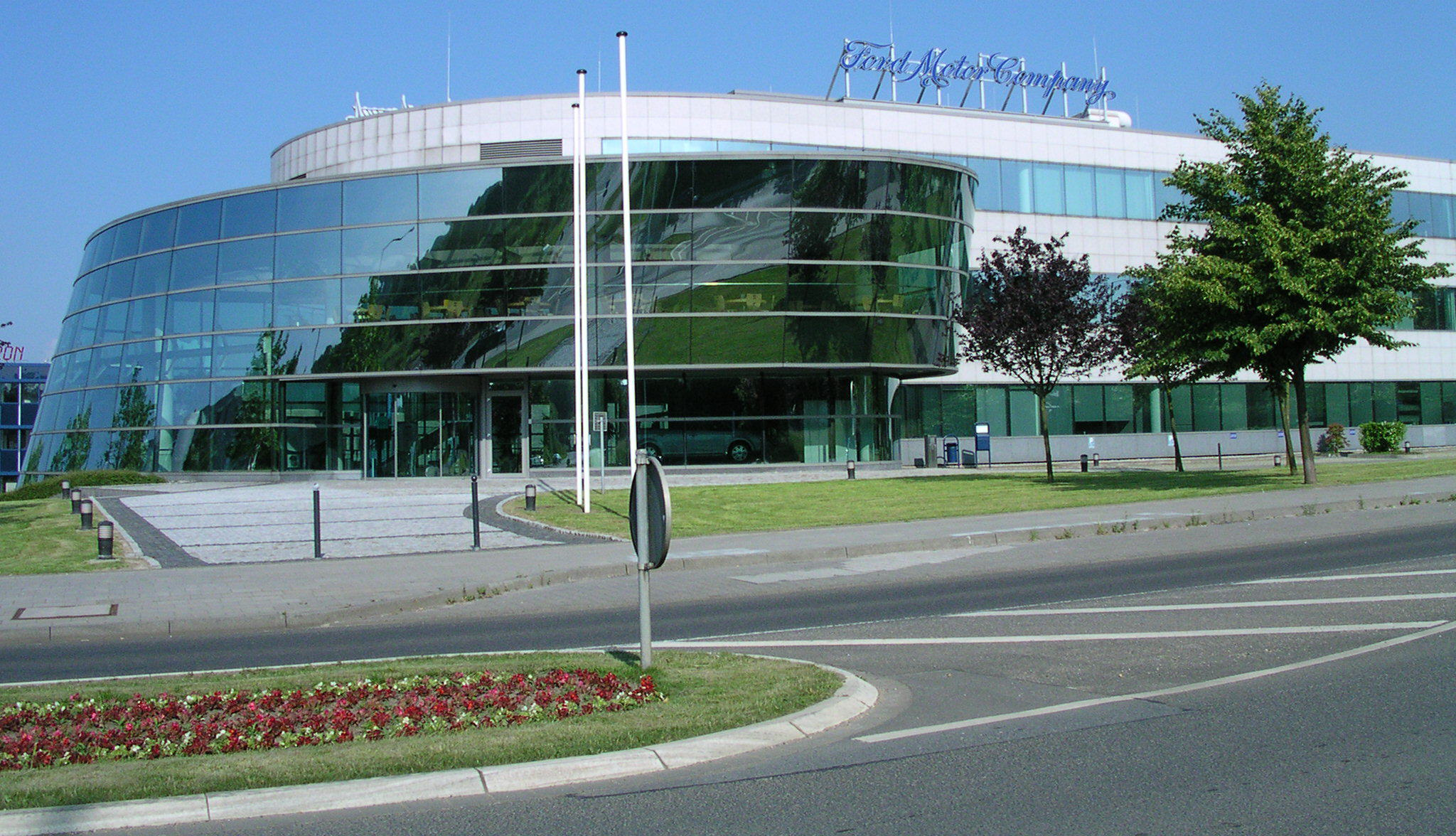
Ford Research Center, Aachen

Aachen is the administrative centre for the coal-mining industries in neighbouring places to the northeast.

Products manufactured in Aachen include electrical goods, fine woolen textiles, foodstuffs (chocolate and candy), glass, machinery, rubber products, furniture, metal products. Also in and around Aachen chemicals, plastics, cosmetics, and needles and pins are produced. Though once a major player in Aachen's economy, today glassware and textile production make up only 10% of total manufacturing jobs in the city. There have been a number of spin-offs from the university's IT technology department.

=== Electric vehicle manufacturing ===
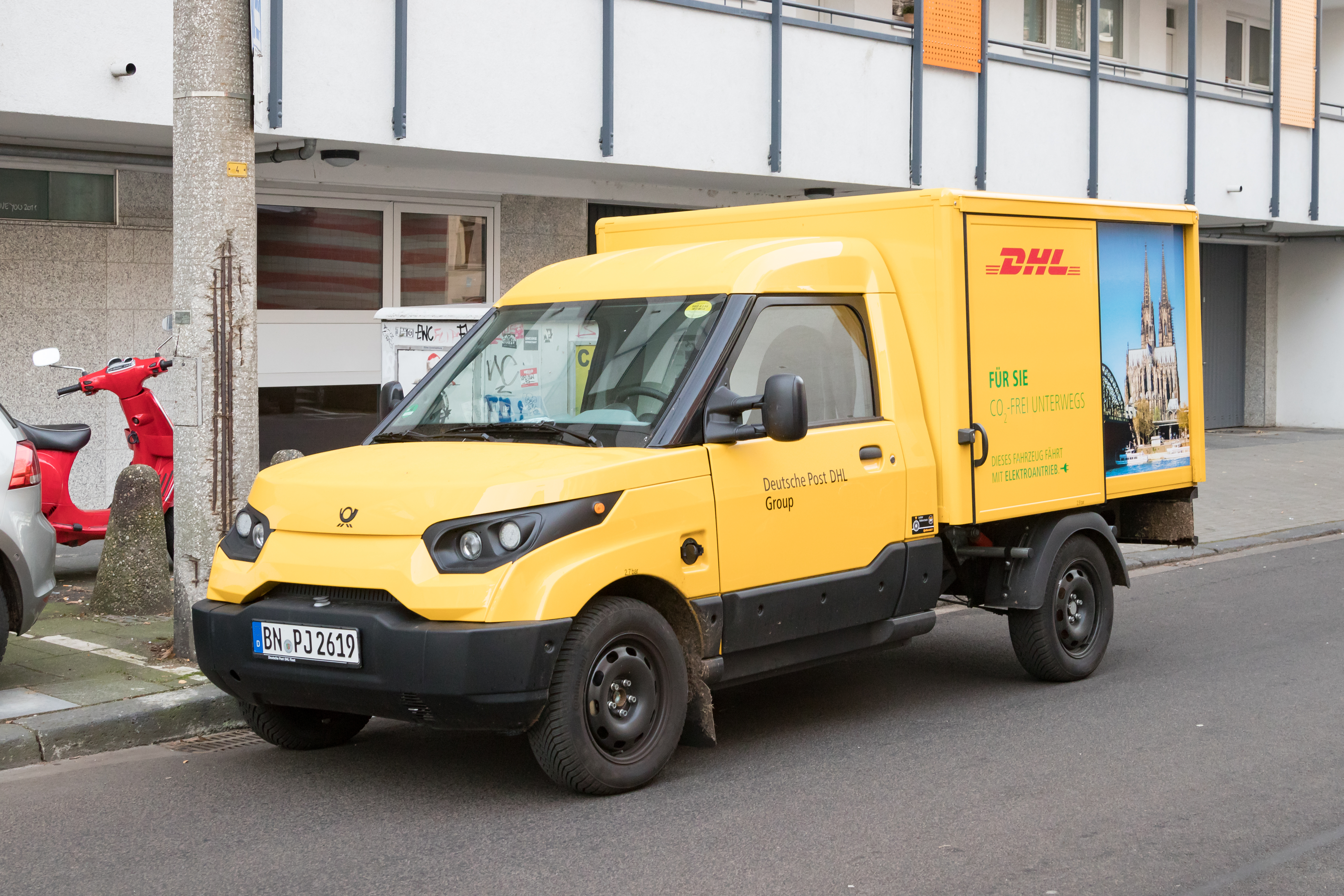
StreetScooter Work as DHL delivery van (2016)

In June 2010, Achim Kampker, together with Günther Schuh, founded a small company to develop electric powered light utility vehicles; in August 2014, it was renamed StreetScooter GmbH. This started as a privately organised research initiative at the RWTH Aachen University, before becoming the independent company in Aachen. Kampker was also the founder and chairman of the European Network for Affordable and Sustainable Electromobility. In May 2014, the company announced that the city of Aachen, the city council Aachen and the savings bank Aachen had ordered electric vehicles from the company. In late 2014, approximately 70 employees were manufacturing 200 vehicles annually in the premises of the Waggonfabrik Talbot, the former Talbot/Bombardier plant in Aachen.

In December 2014 DHL Group purchased the StreetScooter company from Günther, operating it as a wholly owned subsidiary.

In 2015, Günther founded a new electric vehicle company, e.GO Mobile, which started producing the e.GO Life electric passenger car and other vehicles in April 2019.

By April 2016, StreetScooter announced that it would produce 2000 of its electric vans, branded the Work, in Aachen by the end of the year, and would be scaling up to manufacture approximately 10,000 Works annually, starting in 2017, also in Aachen. At the time, this target would make it the largest electric light utility vehicle manufacturer in Europe, surpassing Renault's smaller Kangoo Z.E.

== Culture ==
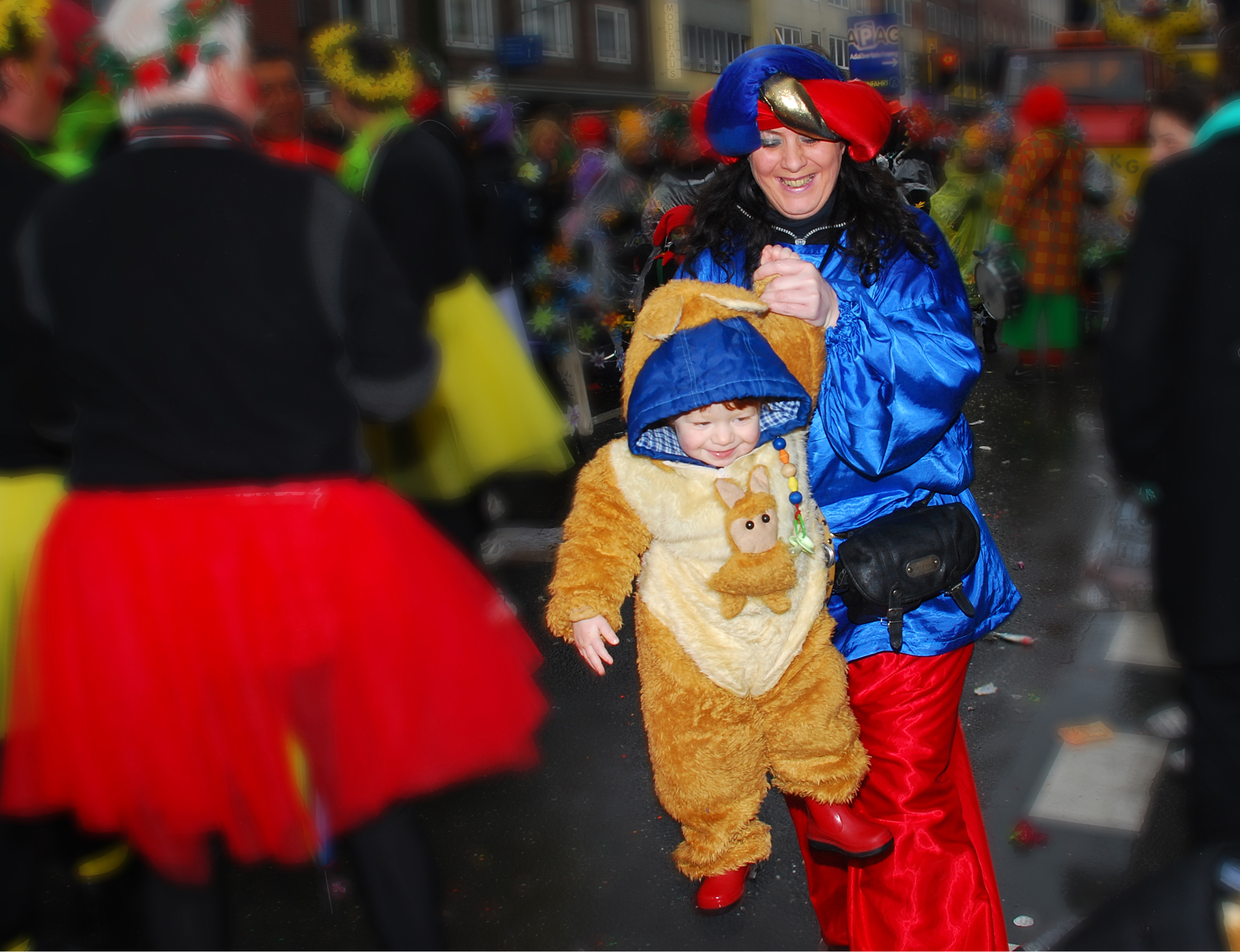
Aachen is also famous for its carnival (Karneval, Fasching), in which families dress in colourful costumes.

- In 1372, Aachen became the first coin-minting city in the world to regularly place an Anno Domini date on a general circulation coin, a groschen.
- The Scotch Club in Aachen was the first discothèque in Germany, opened from 19 October 1959 until 1992. Klaus Quirini as DJ Heinrich was the first DJ ever.
- The thriving Aachen black metal scene is among the most notable in Germany, with such bands as Nagelfar, The Ruins of Beverast, Graupel and Verdunkeln.
- The local speciality of Aachen is an originally hard type of sweet bread, baked in large flat loaves, called Aachener Printen. Unlike Lebkuchen, a German form of gingerbread sweetened with honey, Printen use a syrup made from sugar. Today, a soft version is sold under the same name which follows an entirely different recipe.
- Asteroid 274835 Aachen, discovered by amateur astronomer Erwin Schwab in 2009, was named after the city. The official naming citation was published by the Minor Planet Center on 8 November 2019 (M.P.C. 118221).
- Kammerchor Carmina Mundi, a professional chamber choir

== Education ==
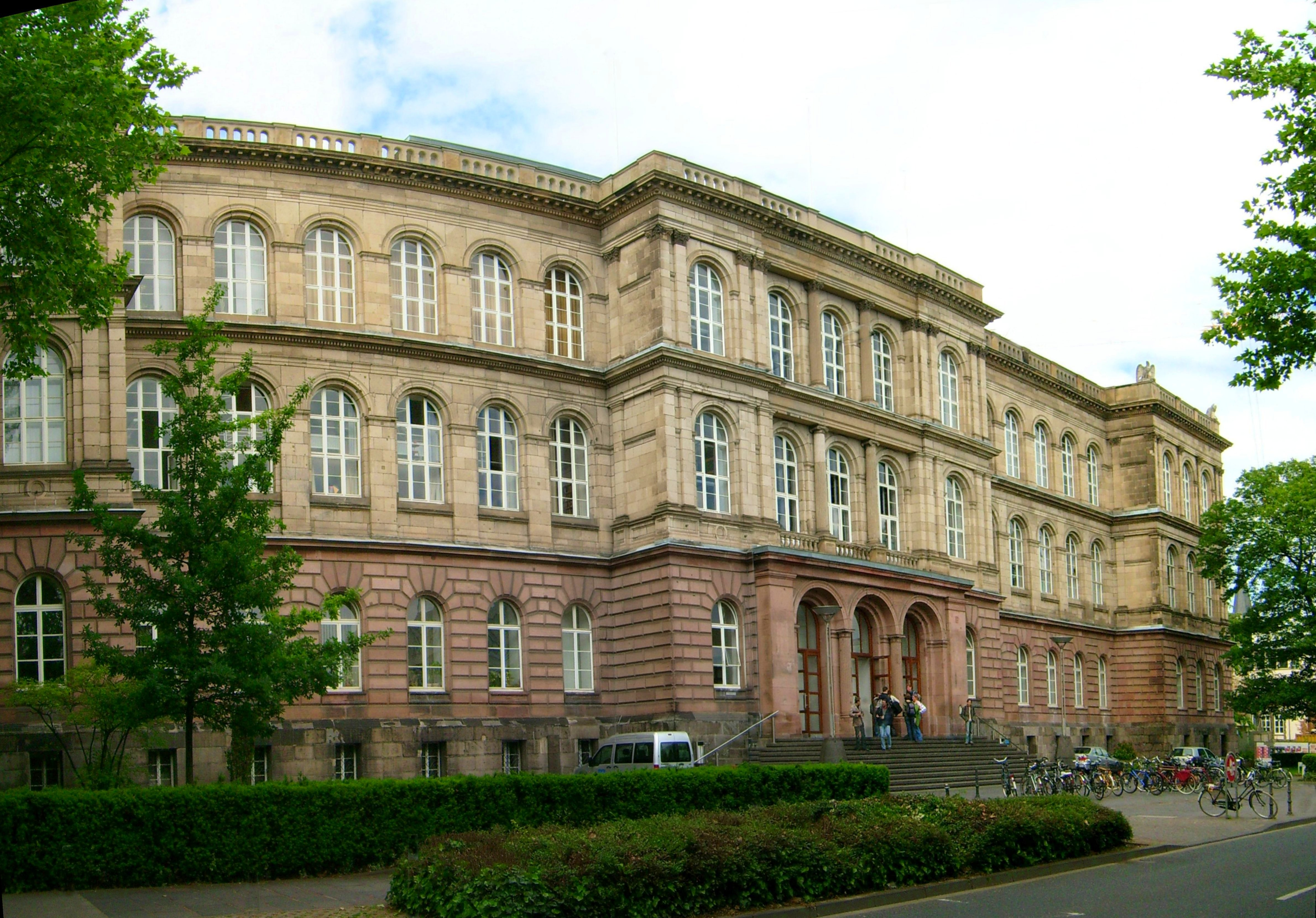
The main building of RWTH Aachen University

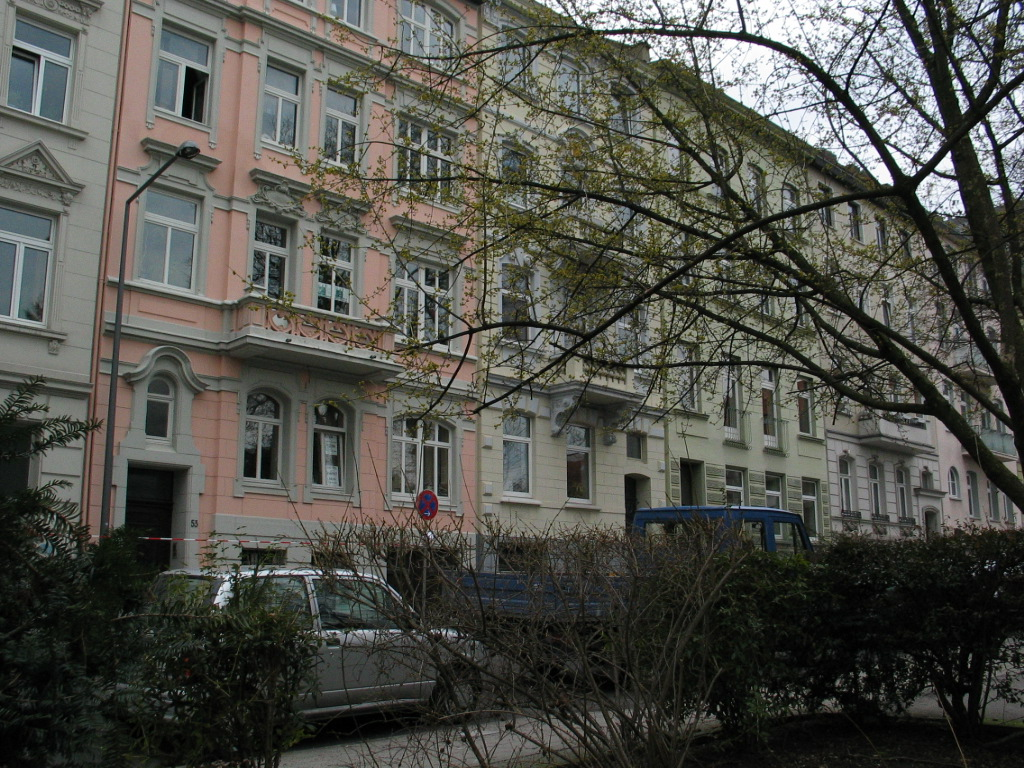
Typical Aachen street with early 20th-century Gründerzeit houses

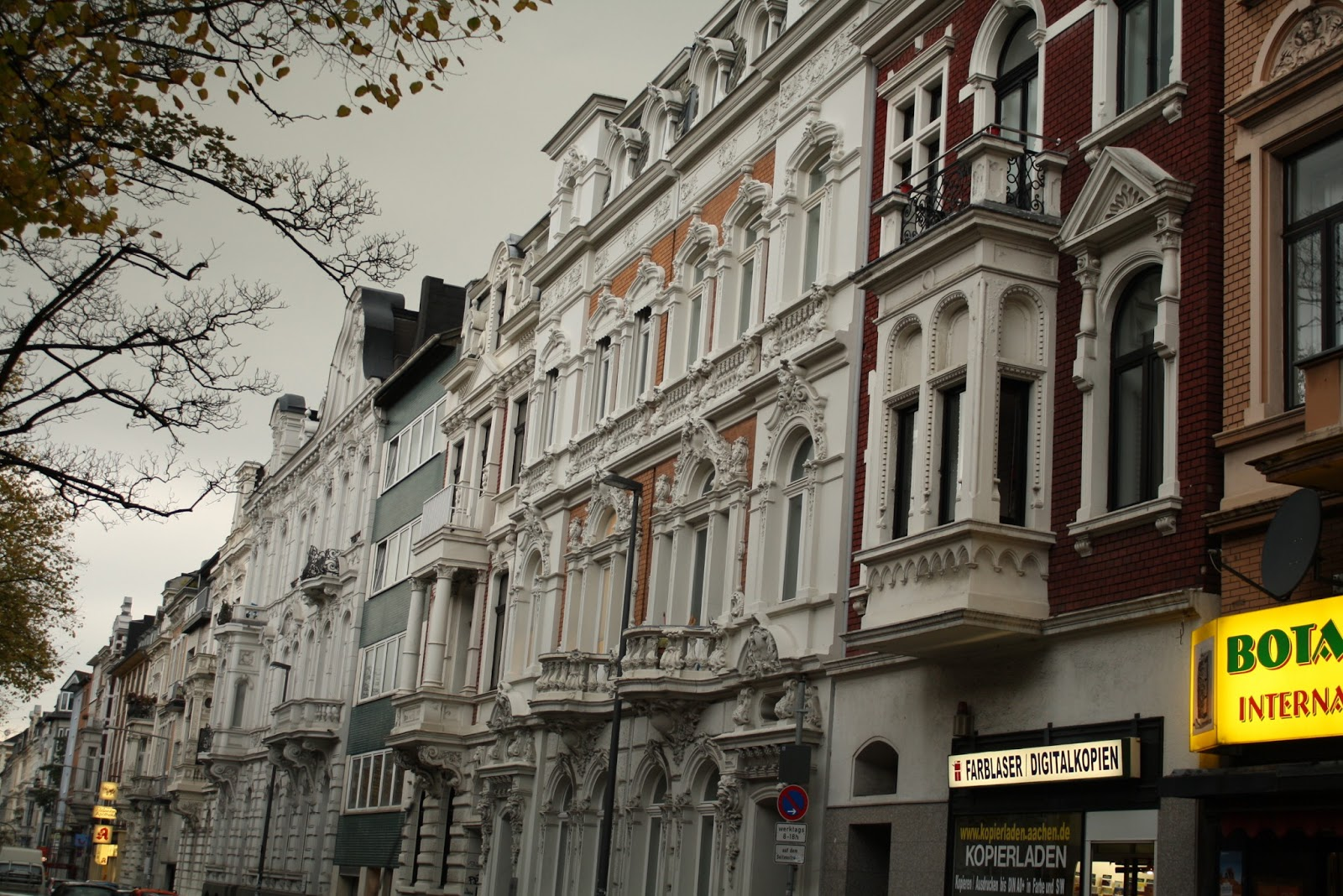
Another example of Aachen early 20th-century Gründerzeit houses

RWTH Aachen University, established as Polytechnicum in 1870, is one of Germany's Universities of Excellence with strong emphasis on technological research, especially for electrical and mechanical engineering, computer sciences, physics, and chemistry. The university clinic attached to the RWTH, the Klinikum Aachen, is the biggest single-building hospital in Europe. Over time, a host of software and computer industries have developed around the university. It also maintains a botanical garden (the Botanischer Garten Aachen).

FH Aachen, Aachen University of Applied Sciences (AcUAS) was founded in 1971. The AcUAS offers a classic engineering education in professions such as mechatronics, construction engineering, mechanical engineering or electrical engineering. German and international students are educated in more than 20 international or foreign-oriented programmes and can acquire German as well as international degrees (Bachelor/Master) or Doppelabschlüsse (double degrees). Foreign students account for more than 21% of the student body.

The Katholische Hochschule Nordrhein-Westfalen – Abteilung Aachen (Catholic University of Applied Sciences Northrhine-Westphalia – Aachen department) offers its some 750 students a variety of degree programmes: social work, childhood education, nursing, and co-operative management. It also has the only programme of study in Germany especially designed for mothers.

The Hochschule für Musik und Tanz Köln (Cologne University of Music) is one of the world's foremost performing arts schools and one of the largest music institutions for higher education in Europe with one of its three campuses in Aachen. The Aachen campus substantially contributes to the Opera/Musical Theatre master's programme by collaborating with the Theater Aachen and the recently established musical theatre chair through the Rheinische Opernakademie.

The German Army's technical school (Ausbildungszentrum Technik Landsysteme) is located in Aachen.

== Sports ==
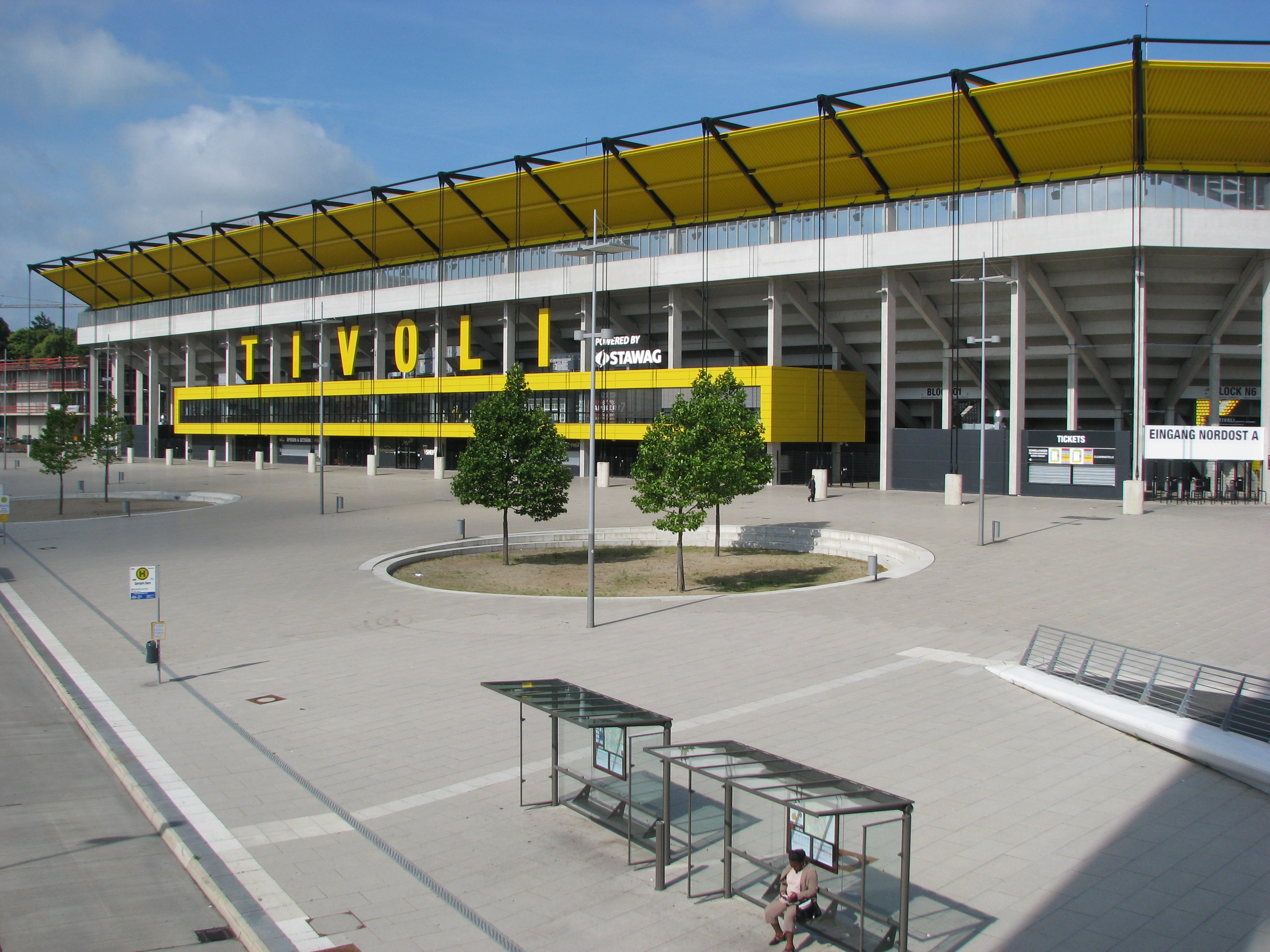
New Tivoli, home ground of Alemannia Aachen

The annual CHIO (short for the French term Concours Hippique International Officiel) is the biggest equestrian meeting of the world and among horsemen is considered to be as prestigious for equitation as the tournament of Wimbledon for tennis. Aachen hosted the 2006 FEI World Equestrian Games.

The local football team Alemannia Aachen had a short run in Germany's first division, after its promotion in 2006. However, the team could not sustain its status and is now back in the third division. The stadium "Tivoli", opened in 1928, served as the venue for the team's home games and was well known for its incomparable atmosphere throughout the whole of the second division. Before the old stadium's demolition in 2011, it was used by amateurs, whilst the Bundesliga Club held its games in the new stadium "Neuer Tivoli" – meaning New Tivoli—a couple of metres down the road. The building work for the stadium which has a capacity of 32,960, began in May 2008 and was completed by the beginning of 2009. In the 2025–26 season, Alemannia recorded an average home attendance of 23,098 across 17 home matches, the second-highest in the 3. Liga.

The Ladies in Black women's volleyball team (part of the "PTSV Aachen" sports club since 2013) has played in the first German volleyball league (DVL) since 2008.

In June 2022, the local basketball club BG Aachen e.V. was promoted to the 1st regional league.

== Transport ==
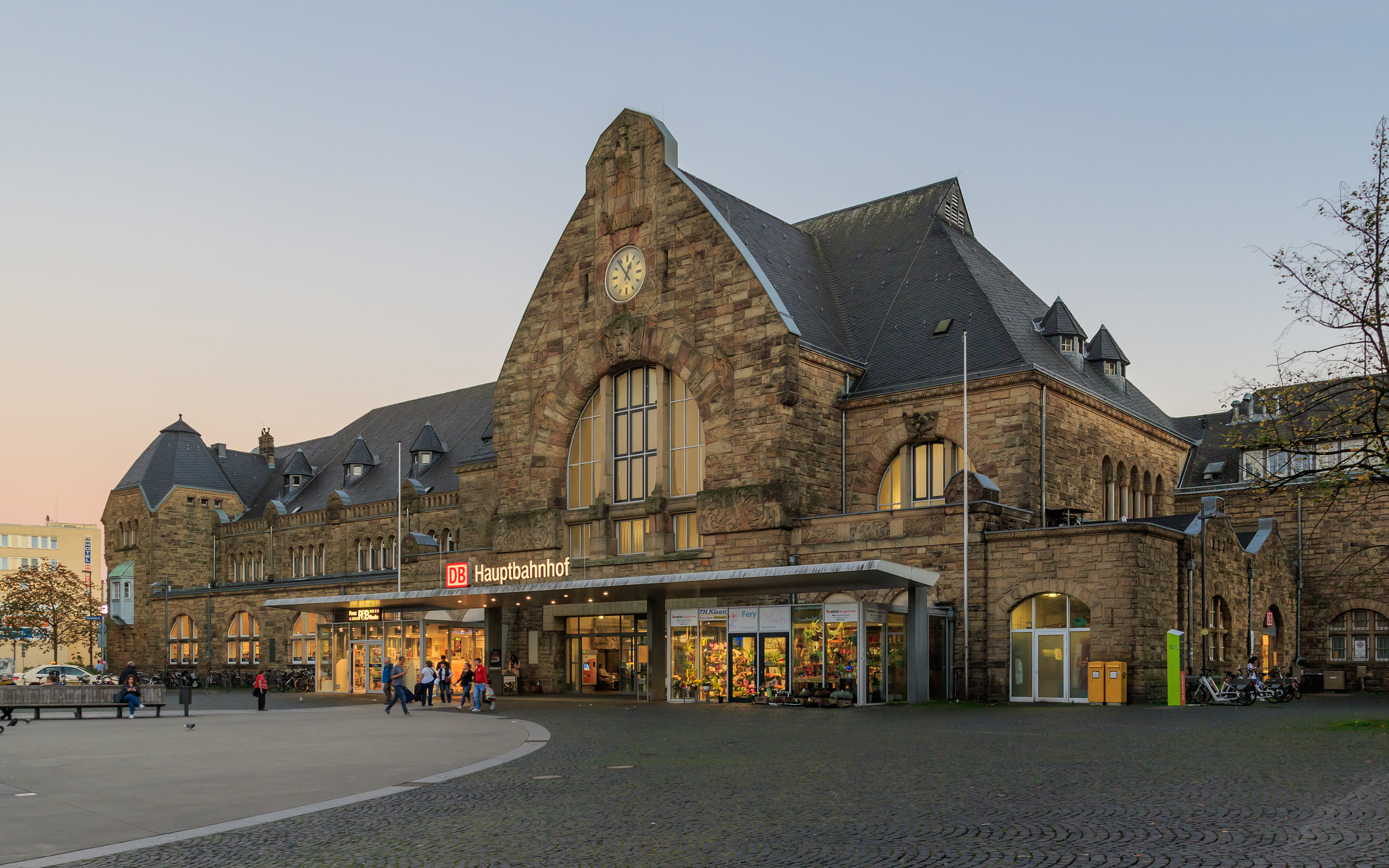
Aachen Central Station

=== Rail ===
Aachen's railway station, the Hauptbahnhof (Central Station), was constructed in 1841 for the Cologne–Aachen railway line. In 1905, it was moved closer to the city centre. It serves main lines to Cologne, Mönchengladbach and Liège as well as branch lines to Heerlen, Alsdorf, Stolberg and Eschweiler. ICE high speed trains from Brussels via Cologne to Frankfurt am Main and Eurostar trains from Paris to Cologne also stop at Aachen Central Station. Four RE lines and two RB lines connect Aachen with the Ruhrgebiet, Mönchengladbach, Spa (Belgium), Düsseldorf and the Siegerland. The Euregiobahn, a regional railway system, reaches several minor cities in the Aachen region.

There are four smaller stations in Aachen: Aachen West, Aachen Schanz, Aachen-Rothe Erde and Eilendorf. Slower trains stop at these. Aachen West has gained in importance with the expansion of RWTH Aachen University.

=== Intercity bus stations ===
There are two stations for intercity bus services in Aachen: Aachen West station, in the north-west of the city, and Aachen Wilmersdorfer Straße, in the north-east.

=== Public transport ===
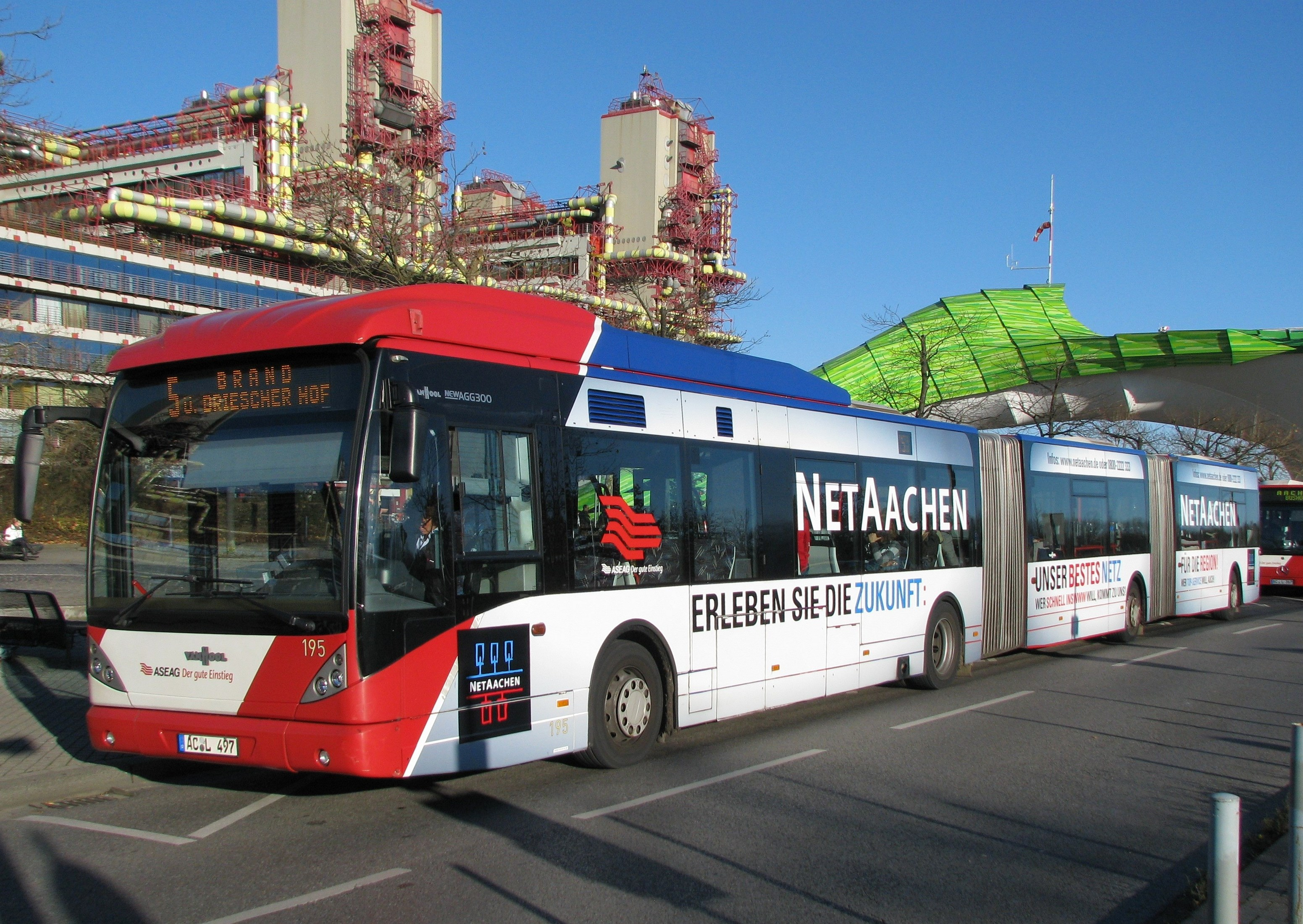
Bi-articulated bus of the city's transit authority ASEAG, at the university hospital bus stop

The first horse tram line in Aachen opened in December 1880. After electrification in 1895, it attained a maximum length of 213.5 kilometres (132 5/8 miles) in 1915, thus becoming the fourth-longest tram network in Germany. Many tram lines extended to the surrounding towns of Herzogenrath, Stolberg, Alsdorf as well as the Belgian and Dutch communes of Vaals, Kelmis (then Altenberg) and Eupen. The Aachen tram system was linked with the Belgian national interurban tram system. Like many tram systems in Western Europe, the Aachen tram suffered from poorly maintained infrastructure and was so deemed unnecessary and disrupting for car drivers by local politics. On 28 September 1974, the last line 15 (Vaals–Brand) operated for one last day and was then replaced by buses. A proposal to reinstate a tram/light rail system under the name Campusbahn was dropped after a referendum.

Today, the ASEAG (Aachener Straßenbahn und Energieversorgungs-AG, literally "Aachen Tram and Power Supply Company") operates a 1,240.8-kilometre-long (771 mi) bus network with 68 bus routes. Because of the location at the border, many bus routes extend to Belgium and the Netherlands. Lines 14 to Eupen, Belgium and 44 to Heerlen, Netherlands are jointly operated with Transport en Commun and Veolia Transport Nederland, respectively. ASEAG is one of the main participants in the Aachener Verkehrsverbund (AVV), a tariff association in the region. Along with ASEAG, city bus routes of Aachen are served by private contractors such as Sadar, Taeter, Schlömer, or DB Regio Bus. Line 350, which runs from Maastricht, also enters Aachen.

=== Roads ===
Aachen is connected to the Autobahn A4 (west-east), A44 (north-south) and A544 (a smaller motorway from the A4 to the Europaplatz near the city centre). There are plans to eliminate traffic jams at the Aachen road interchange.

=== Airport ===
Maastricht Aachen Airport (IATA: MST, ICAO: EHBK) is the main airport of Aachen and Maastricht. It is located around 15 nautical miles (28 kilometres; 17 miles) northwest of Aachen. There is a shuttle-service between Aachen and the airport. However, the airport only offers limited European destinations. The nearest major international airports are Cologne Bonn Airport, located 88 km (55 mi) east and Düsseldorf Airport, located 97.1 km (60 mi) northeast of Aachen.

Recreational aviation is served by the (formerly military) Aachen Merzbrück Airfield.

== Charlemagne Prize ==
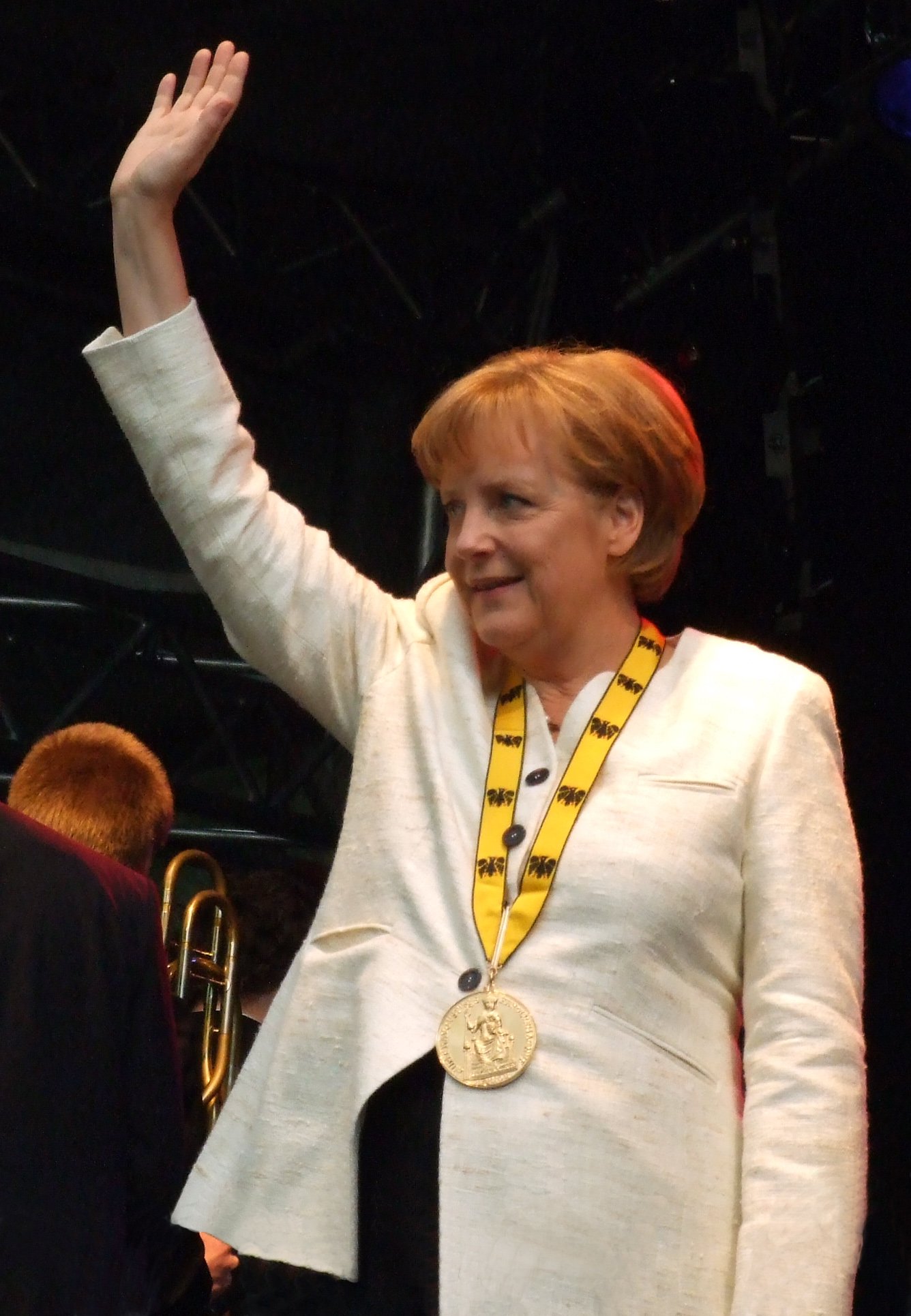
Chancellor of Germany Angela Merkel, wearing the Charlemagne Prize awarded to her in 2008

Since 1950, a committee of Aachen citizens annually awards the Charlemagne Prize (German: Karlspreis) to personalities of outstanding service to the unification of Europe. It is traditionally awarded on Ascension Day at the City Hall. In 2016, the Charlemagne Award was awarded to Pope Francis.

The International Charlemagne Prize of Aachen was awarded in the year 2000 to US president Bill Clinton, for his special personal contribution to co-operation with the states of Europe, for the preservation of peace, freedom, democracy and human rights in Europe, and for his support of the enlargement of the European Union. In 2004, Pope John Paul II's efforts to unite Europe were honoured with an "Extraordinary Charlemagne Medal", which was awarded for the only time ever.

== Literature ==
Aix is the destination in Robert Browning's poem "How They Brought the Good News from Ghent to Aix", which was published in Dramatic Romances and Lyrics, 1845. The poem is a first-person narrative told, in breathless galloping meter, by one of three riders; an urgent midnight errand to deliver "the news which alone could save Aix from her fate".

== Twin towns – sister cities ==
Aachen is twinned with:

- Montebourg, France (1960) (Note: Twinning started by then independent municipality Walheim, now continued by borough Aachen-Kornelimünster/Walheim.)
- Reims, France (1967)
- (United Kingdom) Halifax, England (1979)
- Toledo, Spain (1985)
- Ningbo, China (1986)
- Naumburg, Germany (1988)
- Arlington County, United States (1993)
- Sarıyer, Istanbul, Turkey (2013)
- Cape Town, South Africa (2017)
- Chernihiv, Ukraine (2023)

=== Former twin towns ===
- Kostroma, Russia (2005, suspended since March 2022)

== See also ==
- Aachen (district)
- Aachen Prison
- Aachen tram
- Liège–Aachen Baroque furniture
- Aachener
- Aachener Chronik
- Aachener Bachverein
- Computermuseum Aachen
- Council of Aachen
- List of mayors of Aachen
- Maastricht Aachen Airport
- Treaty of Aix-la-Chapelle (disambiguation)

== Sources ==
- Aachen Department of Environment (2013). "Stadtklima" [Urban Climate] (in German). Archived from the original on 21 April 2014.
- Blood, Philip W (2024). "War Comes To Aachen: The Nazis, Churchill and the 'Stalingrad of the West'". Hurst & Co. Archived from the original on 16 October 2026.
- Aachen Institute for Advanced Study in Computational Engineering Science (2009). "About Aachen". RWTH Aachen University. Archived from the original on 17 May 2021.
- Academy of Music and Dance Cologne (2014). "Profile" (in German). Cologne University of Music. Archived from the original on 25 July 2014.
- Academy of Music and Dance Cologne (2014a). "Homepage" (in German). Cologne University of Music. Archived from the original on 25 July 2014.
- Anon (28 July 2009). "2thinknow Innovation Cities Global 256 Index". Innovation Cities. Archived from the original on 9 April 2014.
- ActiLingua Academy (2013). "The German Language and Its Many Forms". Vienna. Archived from the original on 22 August 2016.
- "Aachen – römische Bäderstadt: Badeleben in einer römischen Therme" [Aachen – City Roman Baths: Life in a Roman thermal bath]. Archaeology in Aachen (in German). 2013. Archived from the original on 20 January 2020.
- Wetter – Deutschland (4 September 2016). "Wetter Aachen" [Aachen Weather] (in German). Archived from the original on 20 September 2016.
- Anon (2014). "Search: Aachen". The Coordination Forum for Countering Antisemitism. Archived from the original on 29 April 2015.
- Aktualisierung, Letzte (2 May 2012). "Aachen: Wieder mehr Arbeitslose" [Aachen: Again, More Unemployed]. Aachener Nachrichten (in German). Archived from the original on 20 October 2017.
- American-Israeli Cooperative Enterprise (2013). "The Holocaust:Photographs". Jewish Virtual Library. American-Israeli Cooperative Enterprise. Archived from the original on 10 November 2013.
- American-Israeli Cooperative Enterprise (2013a). "The Holocaust:Photographs". Jewish Virtual Library. American-Israeli Cooperative Enterprise. Archived from the original on 17 May 2015.
- Baker, Anni P. (2004). American Soldiers Overseas: The Global Military Presence. Perspectives on the Twentieth Century. Westport, CT: Praeger Publishers. ISBN 0-275-97354-9.
- Bayer, Patricia, ed. (2000). "Aachen". Encyclopedia Americana. Vol. I A-Anjou (1st ed.). Danbury, CT: Grolier Incorporated. ISBN 0-7172-0133-3.
- Bridgwater, W.; Aldrich, Beatrice, eds. (1968). "Aachen". The Columbia-Viking Desk Encyclopædia (3rd ed.). New York, NY: Columbia University Press. ASIN B000UUM90Y.
- Calderdale Council (2012). "Aachen: Twin Towns". Government of the United Kingdom. Archived from the original on 28 September 2013.
- Canby, Courtlandt (1984). "Aachen". In Carruth, Gorton (ed.). The Encyclopedia of Historic Places. Vol. I: A-L. New York, NY: Fact on File Publications. ISBN 0-87196-126-1.
- Catholic University of Applied Sciences (2014). "Homepage". Catholic University of Applied Sciences. Archived from the original on 9 July 2014.
- Catholic University of Applied Sciences (2014a). "Aachen". Catholic University of Applied Sciences. Archived from the original on 29 July 2014.
- City of Aachen (2012). "Bevölkerungsstand" [Population as of] (in German). aachen.de. Archived from the original on 22 October 2014.
- City of Aachen (2013). "Cathedral of Aachen". City of Aachen. Archived from the original on 26 September 2013.
- Cohen, Saul B., ed. (1998). "Aachen". The Columbia Gazetteer of the World. New York, NY: Columbia University Press. ISBN 0-231-11040-5.
- De Jong, Mayke (1996). In Samuel's Image: Child Oblation in the Early Medieval West. Leiden, Netherlands: E. J. Brill. ISBN 90-04-10483-6. LCCN 95025956.
- Dupuy, R. Ernest; Dupuy, Trevor N. (1986). The Encyclopedia of Military History from 3500 B.C. to the Present (2nd Revised ed.). New York, NY: Harper & Row, Publishers. ISBN 0-06-181235-8.
- Egger, Carlo (1977). Lexicon nominum locorum [Lexicon of Place Names] (in Latin). Libreria Editrice Vaticana. ISBN 978-88-209-1254-3.
- Eginhard (2012) [1824]. Annales D'Eginhard; Vie de Charlemagne. Des Faits Et Gestes de Charlemagne [Annals of Eginhard Life of Charlemagne. Facts and gestures of Charlemagne] (in French). Hachette Livre – Bnf. ISBN 978-2-01-252304-3.
- "Aachen". Encyclopædia Britannica. 2006. Archived from the original on 20 November 2008.
- Federal Ministry of Transport, Building, and Urban Development (2013). "Ausgabe der Klimadaten: Monatswerte" [Issue of climate data: monthly data] (in German). Archived from the original on 12 June 2014.
- Freimann, A. J. (1906). "Aix-La-Chapelle (Aachen)". In Singer, Isidore (ed.). The Jewish Encyclopedia. Vol. 1: Aach – Apocalyptic Lit. New York, NY: KTAV Publishing House. Archived from the original on 30 October 2014.
- Friedrich, Jörg (2008). The Fire: The Bombing of Germany, 1940–1945. New York: Columbia University Press. ISBN 978-0231133814.
- Gaehde, Joachim E. (1996). "Aachen: Buildings: Palatine Chapel: Sculpture and Treasury". In Turner, Jane; Brigstocke, Hugh (eds.). The Dictionary of Art. Vol. 1: A to Anckerman. New York, NY: Grove. pp. 4–5. ISBN 0-19-517068-7. LCCN 96013628.
- Gdawietz, Gregor; Leroi, Roland (2008). Von Aachen bis Bielefeld – Vom Tivoli zur Alm [From Aachen to Bielefeld – From Tivoli to the Pasture] (in German). Aachen, Germany: Meyer + Meyer Fachverlag. ISBN 978-3-89899-315-9.
- Geological Survey of North Rhine-Westphalia (2013). "Erdbeben bei Roermond am 13. April 1992" [Earthquake in Roermond on 13 April 1992] (PDF) (in German). Archived from the original (PDF) on 29 October 2013.
- Held, Colbert C. (1997). "Aachen". In Johnston, Bernard (ed.). Collier's Encyclopedia. Vol. I: A to Ameland (1st ed.). New York, NY: P. F. Collier.
- Hoiberg, Dale H., ed. (2010). "Aachen". Encyclopædia Britannica. Vol. I: A-Ak – Bayes (15th ed.). Chicago, IL: Encyclopædia Britannica, Inc. pp. 1–2. ISBN 978-1-59339-837-8.
- Holborn, Hajo (1982) [1959]. A History of Modern Germany. Vol. 1: The Reformation. Princeton, NJ: Princeton University Press. ISBN 0-691-00795-0.
- Holborn, Hajo (1982a) [1964]. A History of Modern Germany. Vol. 2: 1648–1840. Princeton, NJ: Princeton University Press. ISBN 0-691-00796-9.
- Holborn, Hajo (1982b) [1969]. A History of Modern Germany. Vol. 3: 1840–1945. Princeton, NJ: Princeton University Press. ISBN 0-691-00797-7.
- Jourdan, Antoine Jacques Louis (1821). Panckoucke, Charles-Louis-Fleury (ed.). Dictionnaire des Sciences Médicales: Biographie Médicale [Dictionary of Medical Sciences: Medical Biography] (in French). Vol. 4. Paris: C. L. F. Panckoucke.
- Kerner, Maximillian (2013). "Aachen and Europe". City of Aachen. Archived from the original on 18 February 2014.
- Kitchen, Martin (1996). The Cambridge Illustrated History of Germany. Cambridge, UK: Cambridge University Press. ISBN 0-521-45341-0.
- Knufinke, Ulrich (2013). "Aachen: Synagoge und Gemeindezentrum Synagogenplatz" [Aachen: Synagogue and community centre Synagogenplatz]. Zentralrat der Juden in Deutschland. Archived from the original on 10 November 2013.
- McClendon, Charles B. (1996). "Aachen". In Turner, Jane; Brigstocke, Hugh (eds.). The Dictionary of Art. Vol. 1: A to Anckerman. New York, NY: Grove. ISBN 0-19-517068-7. LCCN 96013628.
- McClendon, Charles B. (1996a). "Aachen: Buildings". In Turner, Jane; Brigstocke, Hugh (eds.). The Dictionary of Art. Vol. 1: A to Anckerman. New York, NY: Grove. pp. 1–4. ISBN 0-19-517068-7. LCCN 96013628.
- McKitterick, Rosamond D. (1996). "Aachen: Centre of Manuscript Production". In Turner, Jane; Brigstocke, Hugh (eds.). The Dictionary of Art. Vol. 1: A to Anckerman. New York, NY: Grove. ISBN 0-19-517068-7. LCCN 96013628.
- Merkl, Peter H. (2007). "Aachen". In Kobasa, Paul A. (ed.). World Book. Vol. I: A (1st ed.). Chicago, IL: World Book Inc. ISBN 978-0-7166-0107-4.
- Mielke, Rita (2013). "History of Bathing". City of Aachen. Archived from the original on 17 February 2014.
- Munro, David, ed. (1995). "Aachen (Aix-la-Chapelle)". The Oxford Dictionary of the World. Oxford, UK: Oxford University Press. ISBN 0-19-866184-3.
- Pecinovský, Jindřich (1 December 2009). "Partnerská města Kladna" [Partner of Kladno] (in Czech). Archived from the original on 12 December 2018.
- Ranson, K. Anne, ed. (1998). "Aachen". Academic American Encyclopedia. Vol. I: A – Ang (First ed.). Danbury, CT: Grolier Incorporated. ISBN 0-7172-2068-0.
- RWTH Aachen University (2013). "Excellence Initiative". RWTH Aachen University. Archived from the original on 24 January 2014.
- RWTH Aachen University (31 May 2016). "Internationalisierung" [Internationalisation]. Aachen University. Archived from the original on 8 March 2016.
- Schäfer, Burkhard; Schäfer, Sibylle (2010). "Biography David Garrett". David Garrett. Archived from the original on 3 November 2013.
- Schaub, Andreas (2013). Andreas Schaub explains the archaeological record in court in Archäologie am Hof. City of Aachen (Audio) (in German). Archived from the original (MP3) on 29 September 2013.
- Schmetz, Oliver (2011). "Bestürzung über Nazi-Attacke auf Synagoge" [Dismay over Nazi attack on synagogue]. Aachener Zeitung. Archived from the original on 10 November 2013.
- Schumacher, Wolfgang (23 January 2009). "Keltisches Glas und eine römische Villa im Elisengarten" [Celtic glass and a Roman villa in Elisengarten]. Aachener Nachrichten (in German).
- Der Spiegel (9 May 2013). "Karlspreis-Trägerin Grybauskaite: Macht eure Hausaufgaben!" [Charlemagne Prize winner Grybauskaite: Does your homework!]. Der Spiegel (in German). Hamburg.
- Stanton, Shelby L. (2006) [1984]. World War II Order of Battle: An Encyclopedic Reference to U.S. Army Ground Forces from Battalion through Division, 1939–1946 (2nd ed.). Mechanicsburg, PA: Stackpole Books. ISBN 978-0-8117-0157-0.
- University of Cologne, Seismological Station Bensberg (2013). "Zum 250. Jahrestag des Dürener Erdbebens" [The 250th Anniversary of the Düren earthquake] (in German). Archived from the original on 31 March 2019.
- Van der Gragt, F. (1968). Europe's Greatest Tramways Network. Leiden, Netherlands: E. J. Brill. ASIN B000MOT6T0.
- Van der Meer, Willemina; Richter, Elisabeth; Opitz, Helmut, eds. (1998). World guide to special libraries. Vol. 2 (4th ed.). K G Saur Verlag Gmbh & Co. ISBN 978-3-598-22249-8.
- Wilson, Peter H. (2004). Black, Jeremy (ed.). From Reich to Revolution: German History, 1558–1806. European History in Perspective. Hampshire, UK: Palgrave Macmillan. ISBN 0-333-65244-4.
- Young, Margaret Walsh; Stetler, Susan L., eds. (1987). "Germany, Federal Republic of". Aachen. Cities of the World. Vol. 3: Europe and the Mediterranean Middle East (3rd ed.). Detroit, MI: Gale Research Company. ISBN 0-8103-2541-1.
