= Timeline of Aachen =

The following is a timeline of the history of the city of Aachen, Germany.

== Prior to 14th century ==
- 451 – Town "pillaged by the Huns."
- 786 – Palace of Charlemagne construction begins.
- 796 – Palatine Chapel construction begins (approximate date).
- 799 – Karlsschützengilde (militia) formed.
- 813 – 13 September: Coronation of Louis the Pious as King of the Franks.
- 814 – 28 January: Death of Charlemagne.
- 816 – Catholic Council of Aachen establishes the Rule of Aix.
- 936 – 7 August: Coronation of King of Germany Otto I in Aachen Cathedral.
- 961 – Coronation of Otto II.
- 983
  - Coronation of Otto III as King of Germany.
  - Chapel rebuilt.
- 1028 – Coronation of Henry III as King of Germany.
- 1054 – Coronation of Henry IV
- 1087 – Coronation of Conrad II.
- 1099 – Coronation of Henry V as King of Germany.
- 1125 – Coronation of Lothair II as King of the Romans.
- 1138 – Coronation of Conrad III as King of the Romans.
- 1147 – Coronation of Henry Berengar as King of Germany.
- 1152 – Coronation of Frederick I as King of the Romans.
- 1169 – Coronation of Henry VI as King of the Romans.
- 1198 – Coronation of Otto IV.
- 1205 – Coronation of Philip of Swabia.
- 1215
  - Coronation of Frederick II.
  - Karlsschrein (shrine of Charlemagne) built in cathedral.
- 1222 – Coronation of Henry as German King.
- 1248 – Siege of Aachen; followed by coronation of William II of Holland.
- 1257 – Coronation of Richard as King of the Romans.
- 1273 – Coronation of Rudolph I.
- 1292 – Coronation of Adolf, King of Germany.
- 1298 – Coronation of Albert I.
- late 13th century – Ponttor (city gate) built, first mentioned in 1320.
- 1300 – Marschiertor (gate) built (approximate date).

== 14th–18th centuries ==
- 1306 – Aachen becomes a Free Imperial City of the Holy Roman Empire.
- 1309 – Coronation of Henry VII as King of the Romans.
- 1314 – Coronation of Louis IV as King of the Romans.
- 1349 – Coronation of Charles IV as King of the Romans.
- 1353 – Aachen Town Hall built.
- 1376 – Coronation of Wenceslaus IV as King of Germany.
- 1414 – Coronation of Sigismund as King of the Romans.
- 1442 – Coronation of Frederick III as King of the Romans.
- 1486 – Coronation of Maximilian I as King of the Romans.
- 1520 – Coronation of Charles V as King of Germany.
- 1531 – Coronation of Ferdinand I as King of Germany.
- 1580 – Protestant Reformation (approximate date).
- 1601 – Population: 14,171.

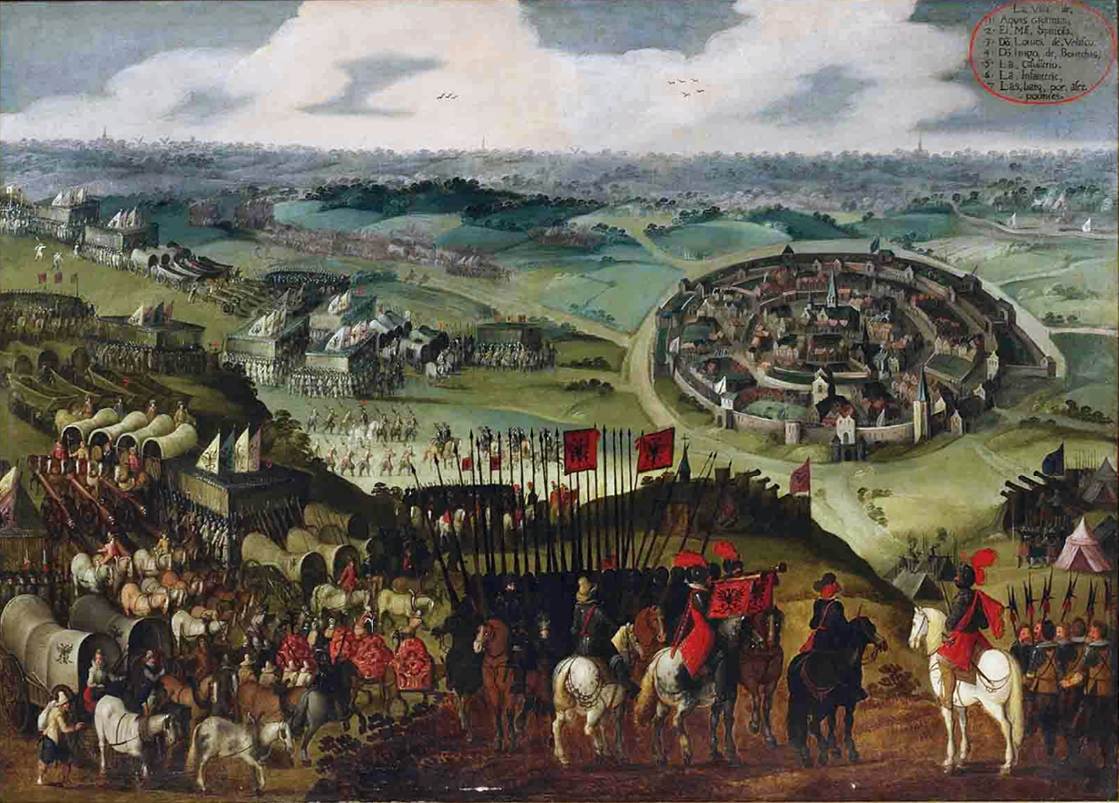
Siege of Aachen (1614)

- 1614 – August: Siege of Aachen.
- 1656 – Fire.
- 1668 – May: Town hosts signing of the Treaty of Aix-la-Chapelle (1668).
- 1748 – April: Town hosts international Congress of Aix-la-Chapelle and signing of treaty.
- 1787 – Aachen Symphony Orchestra active.
- 1794 – Town occupied by French forces.
- 1795 – Population: 23,413.

== 19th century ==
- 1801
  - Town becomes part of France, per Peace of Lunéville.
  - Roman Catholic Diocese of Aachen established.
- 1815 – Town becomes part of the Kingdom of Prussia, per Congress of Vienna.
- 1817
  - Mayersche Buchhandlung (bookseller) in business.
  - Population: 32,300.
- 1818 – October: Town hosts international Congress of Aix-la-Chapelle.
- 1825
  - Theater Aachen opens.
  - Lower Rhenish Music Festival held.
- 1834 – Lower Rhenish Music Festival held; performers include Frédéric Chopin.
- 1840 – Population: 44,289.
- 1841 – Cologne-Aachen railway begins operating.
- 1846 – Lower Rhenish Music Festival held, directed by Felix Mendelssohn; performers include Jenny Lind.

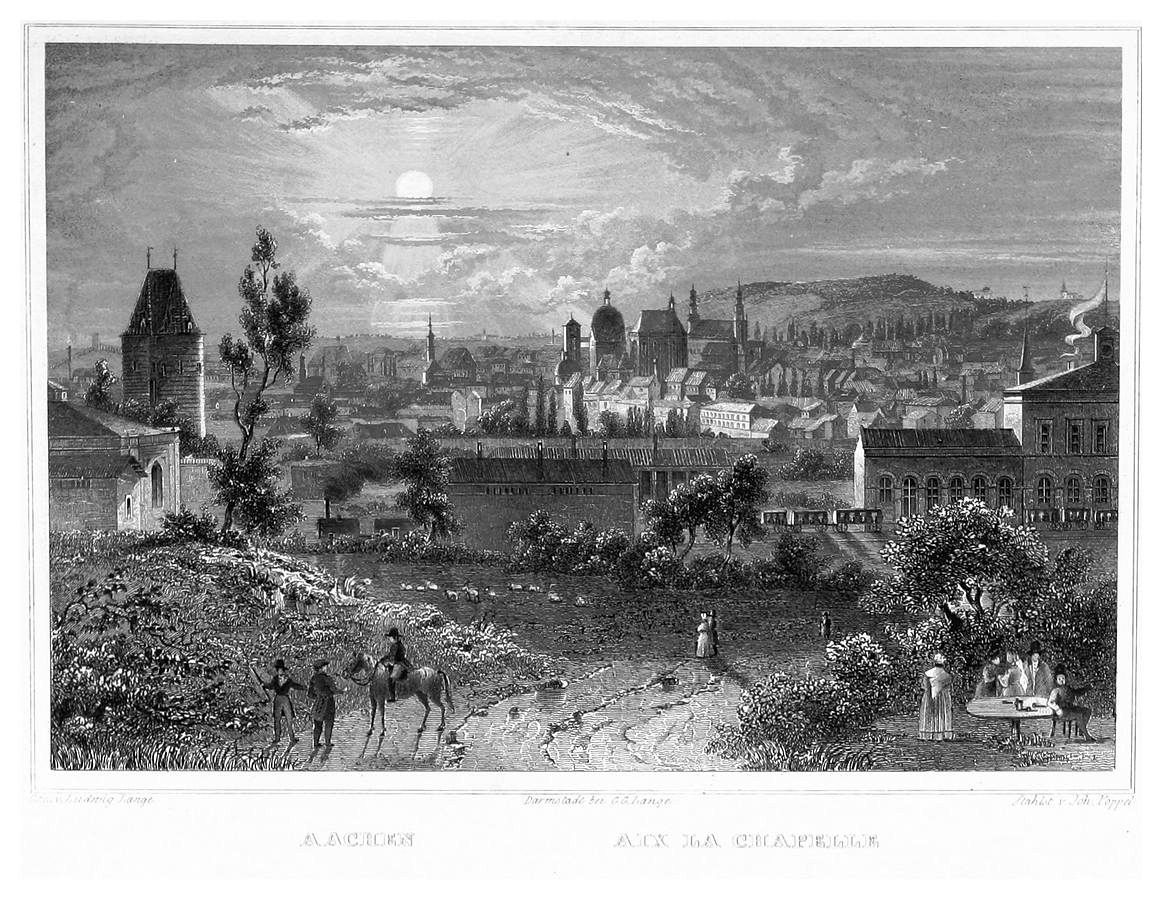
Mid-19th century panorama of the city

- 1849 – Reuters news agency in business.
- 1853 – Aachen–Mönchengladbach railway begins operating.
- 1857 – Lower Rhenish Music Festival held, directed by Franz Liszt.
- 1859 – Church of Our Lady built.
- 1867 – Population: 67,923.
- 1870 – Polytechnikum (school) opens.
- 1880 – Tram begins operating.
- 1885
  - Verein für Kunde der Aachener Vorzeit (history association) founded.
  - Population: 95,321.
- 1888 – Church of St. James built.
- 1890 – Population: 103,470.
- 1895 – Electric tram begins operating.
- 1897 – Burtscheid becomes part of Aachen.
- 1900 – Alemannia Aachen football club formed.

== 20th century ==
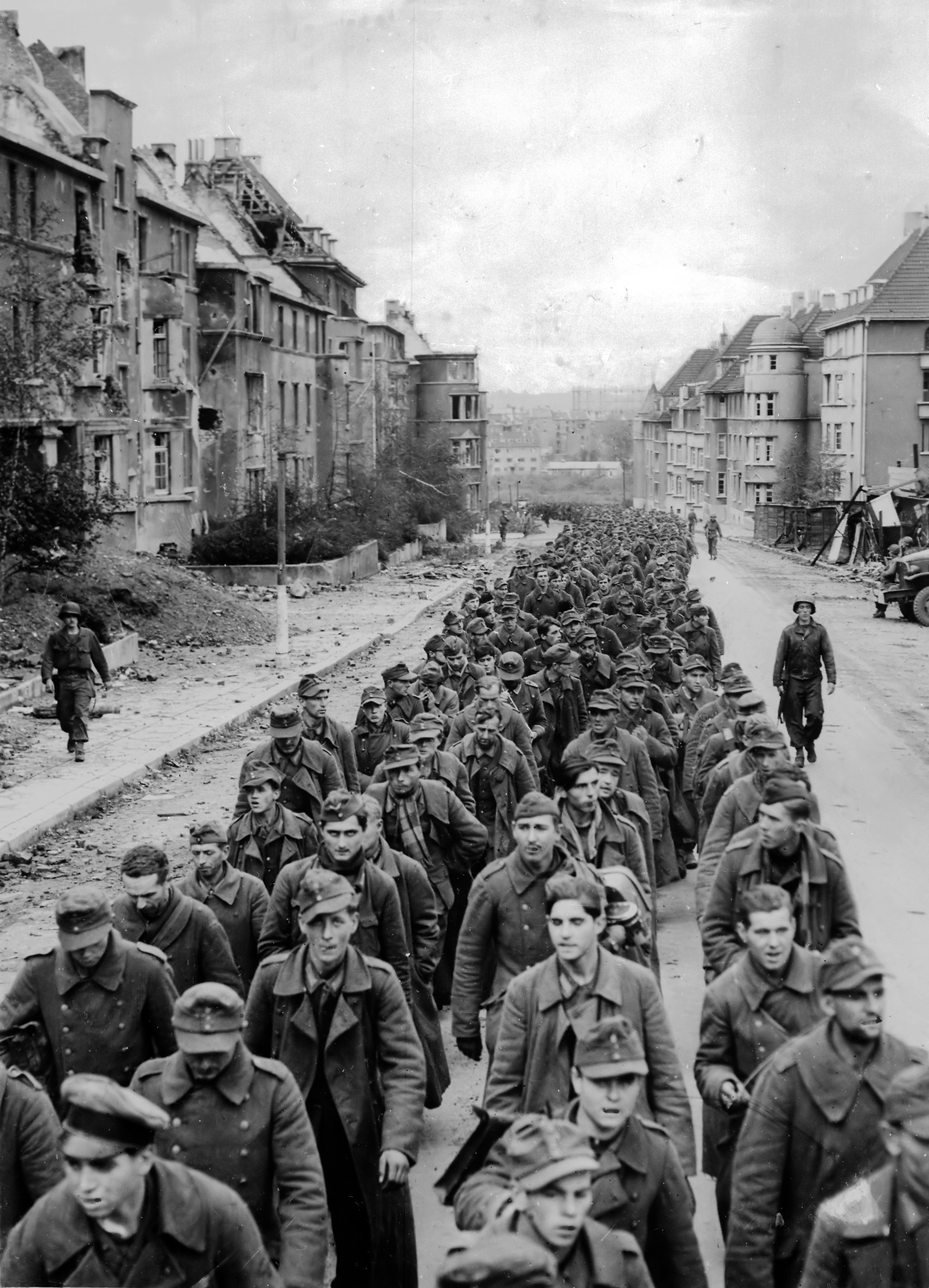
German prisoners of war march through Aachen, October 1944

- 1905 – Aachen Hauptbahnhof (railway station) opens.
- 1908 – Jünglingverein Sankt Jakob Aachen (sport club) formed.
- 1919 – Population: 145,748.
- 1923 – October: Rhenish Republic established.
- 1924 – Rhenish Republic ends.
- 1928 – Tivoli stadium opens.
- 1942 – Forced labour camp established in the Burtscheid district.
- 1944
  - April: Forced labour camp moved from Burtscheid to the Steinebrück district.
  - May: Forced labour camp in Steinebrück dissolved.
  - October: Battle of Aachen. Americans capture city.
- 1949 – Aachen I parliamentary district created.
- 1950 – Zimmertheater Aachen founded.
- 1951 – Theater Aachen rebuilt.
- 1954 – Elysee Theatre re-opens.
- 1956 – Belvedere Water Tower built.
- 1959 – Scotch-Club opens.
- 1960 – Aachener Tierpark (zoo) established.
- 1961 – Museum established in Frankenberg Castle.
- 1965 – Computermuseum Aachen founded.
- 1968 – Bilal Mosque built.
- 1970 – July: Aachen Open Air Pop Festival held.
- 1971
  - Aachen University of Applied Sciences established.
  - Population: 176,626.
- 1972
  - Brand becomes part of Aachen.
  - Kurt Malangré becomes mayor.
  - Population: 238,570.
- 1980 – Rugby Club Aachen formed.
- 1985 – Klinikum Aachen opens.
- 1986
  - First independent Theatre (Theater 99) opens
  - Neuer Aachener Kunstverein (art nonprofit) founded.
- 1989 – Jürgen Linden becomes mayor.
- 2000 – Karlsgarten (garden) opens.

== 21st century ==
- 2003 – Cologne–Aachen high-speed railway in operation.
- 2006 – Host of World Equestrian Games.
- 2009
  - New Tivoli stadium opens.
  - Marcel Philipp becomes mayor.
  - City becomes part of Städteregion Aachen.
- 2012 – Population: 240,086.
- 2015 – City hosts the 2015 European Dressage Championships.
- 2019 – Treaty on Franco-German Cooperation and Integration signed by French president Macron and German Federal Chancellor Merkel.
- 2020 – Sibylle Keupen becomes first female mayor.
- 2025 – Michael Ziemons becomes mayor.

== See also ==
- Aachen history
- List of mayors of Aachen
- History of Aachen
- Timelines of other cities in the state of North Rhine-Westphalia:^{(de)} Bonn, Cologne, Dortmund, Duisburg, Düsseldorf, Essen, Münster

== Bibliography ==
=== in English ===
published in the 18th-19th centuries

- Thomas Nugent (1749), "Aix la Chapelle", The Grand Tour, vol. 1, London: S. Birt, hdl:2027/mdp.39015030762598
- David Brewster, ed. (1830). "Aix-la-Chapelle". Edinburgh Encyclopædia. Edinburgh: William Blackwood. hdl:2027/mdp.39015082314801.
- "Aix-la-Chapelle", Hand-book for travellers on the continent (2nd ed.), London: John Murray, 1838, OCLC 2030550
- Frederick Knight Hunt (1845), "Aix-la-Chapelle", The Rhine: its scenery & historical & legendary associations, London: Jeremiah How
- Theodore Alois Buckley (1862), "Aix-la-Chapelle", Great Cities of the Middle Ages (2nd ed.), London: Routledge, Warne, & Routledge
- Charles Knight, ed. (1866). "Aix-la-Chapelle". Geography. English Cyclopaedia. Vol. 1. London: Bradbury, Evans, & Co. hdl:2027/nyp.33433000064786.
- C.B. Black (1876), "Aix-la-Chapelle", Guide to the north of France, ... Belgium and Holland, Edinburgh: Adam and Charles Black
- "Aix-la-Chapelle", The Rhine (8th ed.), Leipsic: Karl Baedeker, 1882, OCLC 7416969
- W. Pembroke Fetridge (1885), "Aix-la-Chapelle", Harper's hand-book for travellers in Europe and the east, New York: Harper & Brothers
- Norddeutscher Lloyd (1896), "Aachen", Guide through Germany, Austria-Hungary, Italy, Switzerland, France, Belgium, Holland and England, Berlin: J. Reichmann & Cantor, OCLC 8395555
- Aix-La-Chapelle (Aachen) as a Health Resort. London: J. & A. Churchill. 1899.

published in the 20th century

- "Aix-la-Chapelle". Chambers's Encyclopaedia. 1901.
- "Aix-la-Chapelle", The Rhine, Leipzig: Karl Baedeker, 1911, OCLC 21888483
- Nathaniel Newnham Davis (1911), "Aachen", The Gourmet's Guide to Europe (3rd ed.), London: Grant Richards

=== in German ===
- Johann Nopp (1643). Aacher Chronick [Chronicle of Aachen] (in German). Cölln: Kalkoven.
- Zeiller, Martin (1680). "Achen". Topographia Westphaliae. Topographia Germaniae (in German). Frankfurt. p. 6+.. Circa 1647/1660
- Christian Quix. Beiträge zur Geschichte der Stadt Aachen und ihrer Umgebungen. Mit 14 Urkunden, Dritter Band, Jacob Anton Mayer, 1838.
- "Aachen". Biblioteca geographica: Verzeichniss der seit der Mitte des vorigen Jahrhunderts bis zu Ende des Jahres 1856 in Deutschland (in German). Leipzig: Wilhelm Engelmann. 1858. (bibliography)
- Heinrich Benrath (1860), Aachen, Burtscheid und ihre Umgebung [Aachen, Burtscheid and Vicinity] (in German), Aachen: Benrath & Vogelsang, OCLC 225286655, OL 24660587M
- Hugo Loersch. Aachener Rechtsdenkmäler aus dem 13., 14. und 15. Jahrhundert. Bonn 1871.
- Friedrich Haagen. Geschichte Achens von seinen Anfängen bis zur neuesten Zeit. Band 2: Vom Jahre 1400–1865. Aachen 1874.
- "Aus Aachens Vorzeit", Mittheilungen des Vereins "Aachens Vorzeit" (in German), Aachen: Kommissions-Verlag der Cremerschen Buchhandlung: 10 v, 1888–1907
- "Aachen". Brockhaus' Konversations-Lexikon (in German) (14th ed.). Leipzig: Brockhaus. 1896. hdl:2027/njp.32101064064429.
- Aachen (Germany) Oberbürgermeister (1907). Bericht über die Verwaltung der Stadt Aachen ... 1897–1906 [Report on the administration of the city of Aachen] (in German).
- Max Wohlhage: Aachen im Dreissigjährigen Kriege Aachen 1911.
- E. Uetrecht (1913). "Aachen". Meyers Deutscher Städteatlas [Meyer's Atlas of German Cities] (in German). Leipzig: Bibliographisches Institut Meyer. hdl:2027/njp.32101073695320.
- Paul Clemen, ed. (1924). Die profanen Denkmäler und die Sammlungen der Stadt Aachen. Die Kunstdenkmäler der Rheinprovinz (in German). Vol. 10.
- Aachen, Deutscher Städteatlas (in German), vol. 4, Institut für vergleichende Städtegeschichte, 1989, ISBN 3891150008
