= Aachen-Mitte =

- Borough of Aachen
- Interactive map of Aachen-Mitte
- Location within Germany Location within North Rhine-Westphalia
- Coordinates: 50°46′30″N 6°5′3″E
- Country: Germany
- State: North Rhine-Westphalia
- District: Urban district
- City: Aachen
- Elevation: 170 m (560 ft)

Population (2020-12-31)
  - Total: 166,564
- Time zone: UTC+01:00 (CET)
  - Summer (DST): UTC+02:00 (CEST)
- Postal codes: 52062, 52064, 52066, 52068, 52070
- Dialling codes: 0241

Aachen-Mitte is one of the seven boroughs of the city of Aachen, Germany, and contains the quarters of Beverau, Bildchen, Burtscheid, Forst, Frankenberg, Grüne Eiche, Hörn, Lintert, Pontviertel, Preuswald, Ronheide, Rothe Erde, Stadtmitte, Steinebrück and West.

As the center of the city of Aachen, the district is by far the most populated, with over 168,000 residents. It contains both the Aachen Cathedral and Aachen Rathaus, which are each near the city center, as well as Aachen's main theatre. Numerous squares, including Hansemannplatz, Kaiserplatz, and Lindenplatz are likewise contained within the district, as is the medieval Ponttor, which was one of the original gates in the wall surrounding the city.

== Sights ==
Attractions include:

- the Aachen Cathedral
- the Aachen Rathaus
- the Historical Altstadt
- the medieval Ponttor
- the association football stadium new Tivoli
- Frankenberg Castle
- Burtscheid Abbey
- Aachen's City Gardens
- the Lousberg, a high hill near downtown Aachen
- the Elisenbrunnen, a hot water spring in downtown Aachen
- the Suermondt-Ludwig Museum, named for the Aachen entrepreneur Barthold Suermondt
