= List of mayors of Aachen =

This is a list of mayors (Oberbürgermeister) and city managers (Oberstadtdirektor) of Aachen, Germany. The latter office existed from 1946 to 1995.

== Mayors (Oberbürgermeister) since 1815 ==
- 1815–1820: Cornelius von Guaita
- 1820–1831: Wilhelm Daniels and Dr. med. Matthias Solders
- 1831–1848: Edmund Emundts
- 1848–1851: Arnold Edmund Pelzer
- 1851–1875: Johann Contzen
- 1875–1883: Ludwig von Weise
- 1884–1896: Ludwig Pelzer
- 1896–1916: Philipp Veltmann
- 1916–1928: Wilhelm Farwick
- 1929–1933: Dr. Wilhelm Rombach
- 1933–1944: Quirin Jansen
- 1944–1945: Franz Oppenhoff
- 1945: Dr. Wilhelm Rombach
- 1946: Ludwig Kuhnen
- 1946–1952: Dr Albert Maas
- 1952–1973: Hermann Heusch
- 1973–1989: Kurt Malangré, CDU
- 1989–2009: Dr. Jürgen Linden, SPD
- 2009–2020: Marcel Philipp, CDU
- 2020-2025: Sibylle Keupen
- since 2025: Michael Ziemons, CDU

== City managers (Oberstadtdirektoren) 1946–95 ==
- 1946–1954: Albert Servais
- 1954–1975: Dr. Anton Kurze
- 1975–1995: Dr. Heiner Berger

== See also ==
- Timeline of Aachen
