= Gregor von Burtscheid =

Abbot in Germany (c.940–999)

Gregor von Burtscheid (Greek: Γρηγόριος ὁ Καλαβρός, c. 940 - 4 November 999), also known as Gregor von Calabria or Gregory of Cerchiara, was the first abbot of the Burtscheid Abbey, founded on the order of Otto III, Emperor of the Holy Roman Empire.

== Life ==
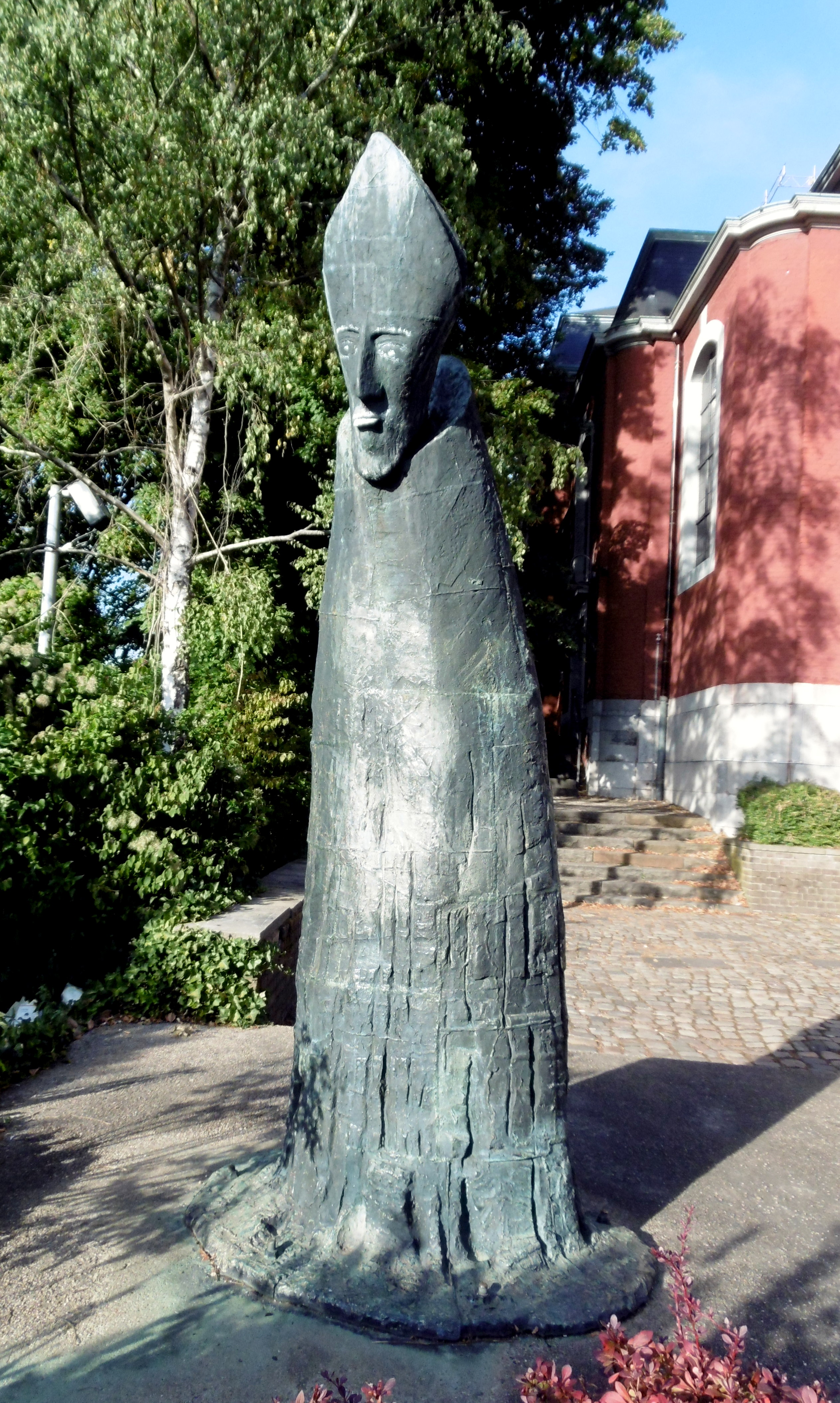
Bonifatius Stirnberg: Statue of Gregor in Burtscheid, in front of St. Michael Church.

Gregor von Burtscheid was known in Germany as Gregor von Calabria. He was born in Cerchiara di Calabria (Cosenza province) in Calabria at a time when that region was still under the influence of the Byzantine Empire.

Emperor Otto III founded the Burtscheid Abbey in 997 in the independent city of Burtscheid, and installed Gregor, who until this time was abbot of the Basilian monastery of St. Andreas in Calabria, as first Abbot. Gregor died 4 November 999 with a reputation as a holy man, and thus after his death, his bones were held in the nearby Nicholas Chapel (Nikolaus-kapelle). Around 1190, an Abbot by the name of Arnold transferred the bones to the Abbey church.

By the end of the 12th century, Gregor was bestowed the honor of the altars (zur Ehre der Altäre), and the date of his death was celebrated as a feast day at the abbey, until it was dissolved in 1802.

Due to the heavy bombing of Burtscheid on 11 April 1944, Gregor von Burtscheid's grave was destroyed. The remnants of his bones that could be salvaged were kept in a silver casket. These small reliquaries were transferred in 1996 to the Berdolet altar, which stands in St. Johann Church in Aachen-Burtscheid, where the previous abbey church once stood.

Since 2010, Abbot Gregor has been the patron saint of the dissolved rectories of St Gregorius, Sacred Heart, St. John, and St Michael, as well as the patron of the newly founded parish of St. Gregor von Burtscheid.

== Literature ==
- Vera von Falkenhausen: Gregor von Burtscheid und das griechische Mönchtum in Kalabrien. In: Römische Quartalschrift. Band 93, 1998, S. 215-250.
- Paolo Damiano Franzese: San Gregorio da Cerchiara. Vitae con testo latino a fronte, premessa di Filippo Burgarella, ed. Il Coscile, Castrovillari 2010, ISBN 978-88-96276-11-2. Includes the essay "San Gregorio da Cerchiara. Vita e cultura di un monaco italogreco nel cuore dell'Europa ottoniana", pp. 21–90 (full text on Academia.edu).
- Paolo Damiano Franzese: San Gregorio da Cerchiara, vita e cultura di un monaco italogreco nel cuore dell'Europa ottoniana. In Rivista Storica Calabrese. Band XXIV, 2003, S. 71-123.

== Notes ==
- Literature by and about Gregor von Burtscheid in the German National Library catalogue
