= Jürgen Linden =

German politician

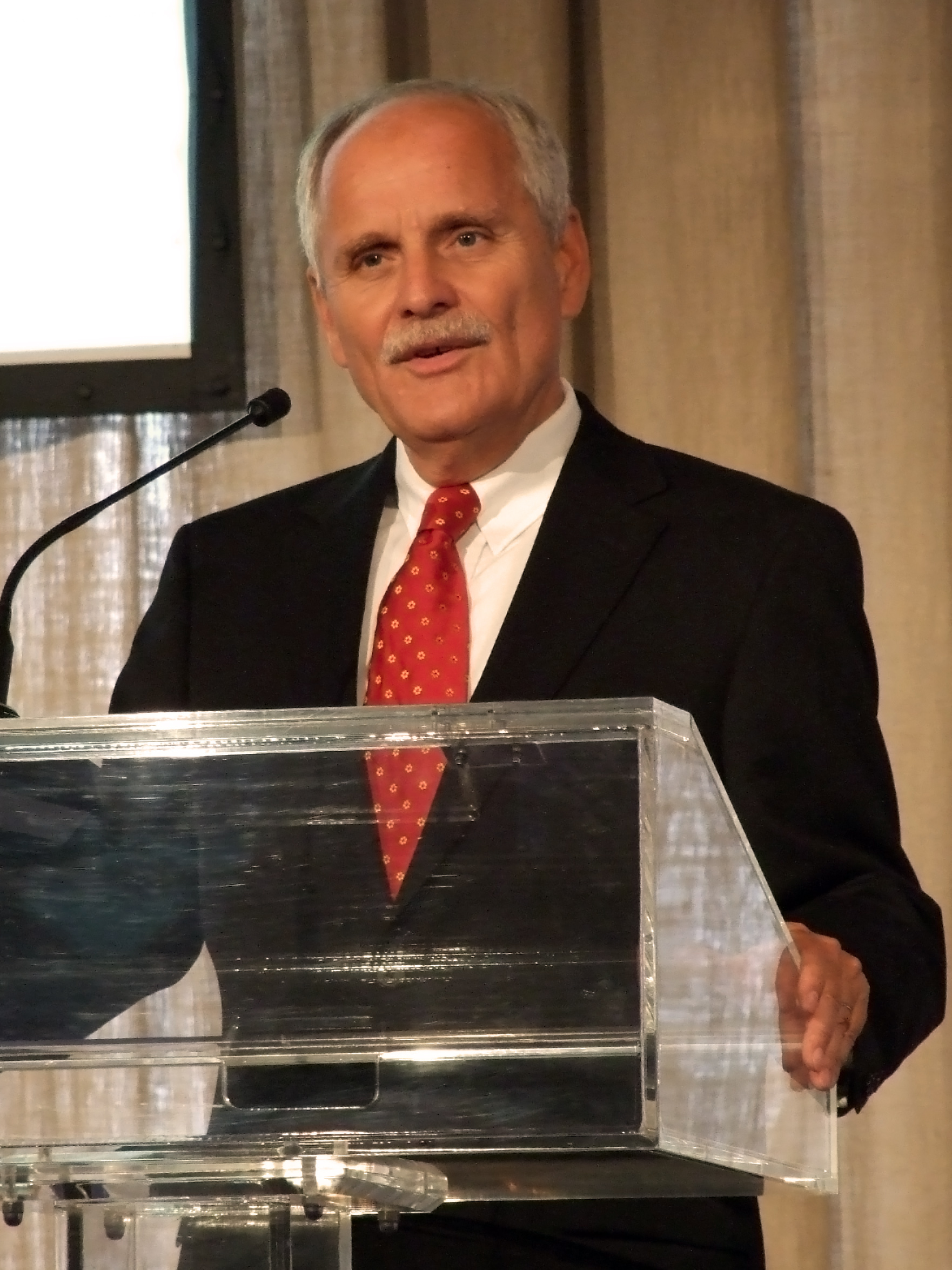
- Juergen Linden at a laudatio for the "Médaille Charlemagne pour les Médias Européens"

Lord Mayor of Aachen
- Preceded by: Kurt Malangré
- Succeeded by: Marcel Philipp

Personal details
- Born: January 13, 1947 (age 79) Aachen, Germany
- Party: Social Democratic Party of Germany
- Spouse: Maria Linden
- Children: Boris, Kolja, Laura
- Education: University of Bonn (J.D.)
- Occupation: Lawyer

Jürgen Linden (born January 13, 1947) is a German politician (Social Democratic Party of Germany) and was Lord Mayor of Aachen from 1989 to 2009.

== Life ==
Linden is the speaker of the board of directors of the Charlemagne Prize of the city of Aachen which is awarded since 60 years to people who extraordinarily contributed to the unification of Europe. Famous prize winners were Winston Churchill, Konrad Adenauer, Juan Carlos I of Spain, Henry Kissinger, Queen Beatrix of the Netherlands, Tony Blair, Angela Merkel and others. Linden initiated around the award ceremony a comprehensive framework program with open-air, forum and the "Karlspreis for the Youth" donated by the Karlspreis Foundation. Linden is a member of the Advisory Board of the Aachen-Laurensberger Rennverein, a member of the Board of Trustees of the Marienhospital in Aachen, Chairman of the Friends of the Historical Collection of Crous, and a member of the extended Board of the Ludwig-Forum for International Art.

== Policy ==
1970 Linden joined the SPD. In 1977 he was elected to the council of his hometown and served from 1984 to 1989 the office of the Honorary Mayor of Aachen.

After the local elections in 1989 a Red-Green coalition came to power and elected Linden on October 18, 1989 as the successor to Kurt Malangré (CDU). After the change of the electoral rules in the state of North Rhine-Westphalia, Linden for the first time in Aachen held the post of a full-time and paid Lord Mayor from October 12, 1995 to October 21, 2009. On April 25, 2008 Linden publicly declared, not to compete at the local elections in 2009. He was succeeded by Marcel Philipp (CDU).

Linden has contributed for the reconstruction of the Jewish Synagogue in Aachen which was destroyed at the Night of Broken Glass (Kristallnacht) on November 9, 1938, and was reinaugurated on May 18, 1995. Linden called into life the Aachen Cultural Summer, a series of events including classical and rock concerts, readings and dance performances. Linden contributed to the economic development of the city of Aachen due to contacts with industry and trade and important German policy makers. A political defeat he suffered due to a Referendum in the project "Bauhaus Europe", a planned cultural center on one of the central squares of Aachen which was not built after the negative Referendum.

== Honors and awards ==
- 2007: Officer's cross of the Order Pro Merito Melitensi of the Sovereign Military Order of Malta (Malteserorden)
- 2008: Officer's Cross of the Order of Merit of the Republic of Poland
- 2008: Freeman of the city of Heerlen
- 2009: Grand Commander of the Ordre National du Mérite of France
- 2009: Freeman of the city of Aachen
- 2009: Golden Honorary Medal of the City of Maastricht
