= Trams in Aachen =

Coordinates: 50°46′31″N 06°04′58″E

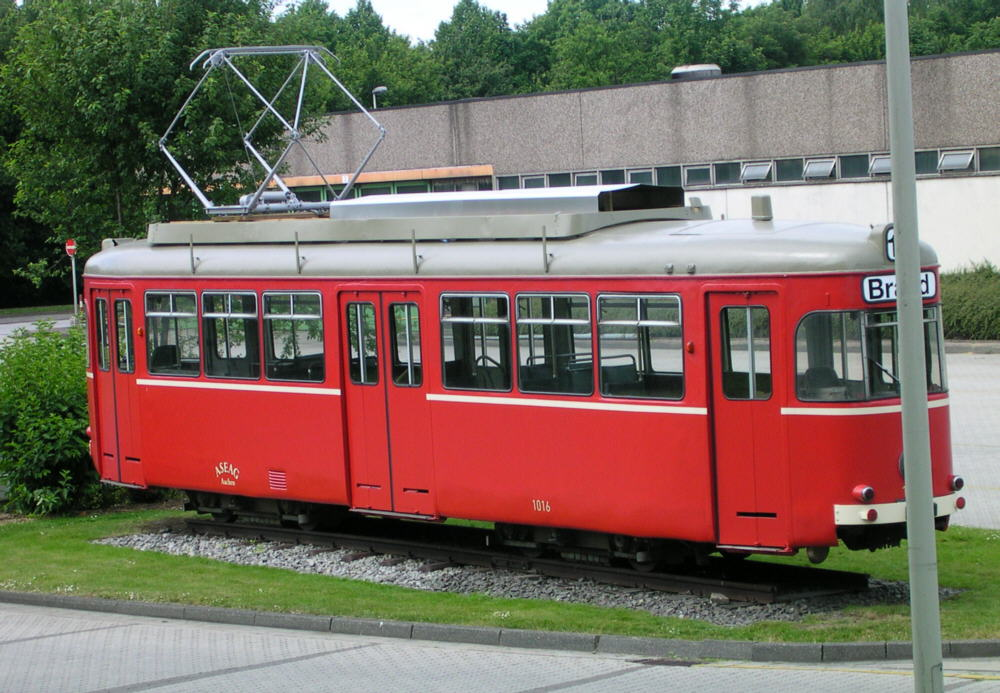
Tram monument on the site of the ASEAG in Aachen

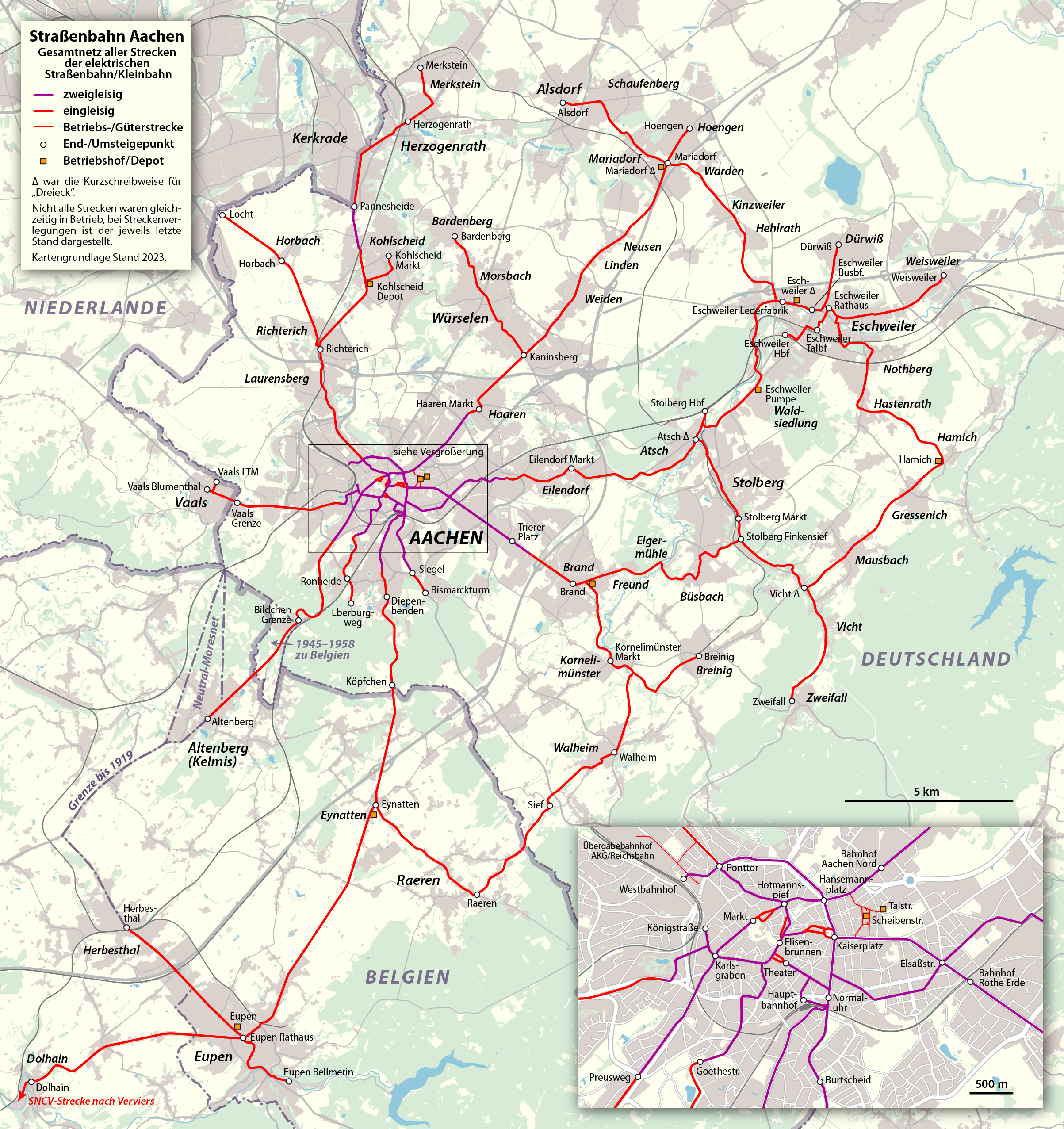
Map of all Aachen tram lines ever in operation, but not all at the same time

Trams in Aachen (German: Straßenbahn Aachen) were a public transport system in the German city of Aachen, North Rhine-Westphalia, and the surrounding areas from 1880 to 1974. The track gauge was 1,000 mm (3 ft 3 3/8 in).

At times, the network also extended into Belgium, the Netherlands, and the territory of Neutral Moresnet. At its maximum extent in 1914, its route length was 181.4 kilometres (112.7 mi) and its line length was 213.5 kilometres (132.7 mi), representing the fourth largest tramway network in Germany, and in general one of the most extensive German interurban networks. In 1974, the last tram line was closed.

At its opening in 1880, it was operated by the Aachener und Burtscheider Pferdeeisenbahn-Gesellschaft (Aachen and Burtscheid Horse Railway Company), which became the Aachener Kleinbahn-Gesellschaft (AKG, in English: Aachen Light Railway Company) in 1894. In 1942 the name was changed to Aachener Straßenbahn und Energieversorgungs-AG (ASEAG, Aachen Tramway and Power Company). Since 1974, ASEAG has continued running the region's bus system.

== See also ==
- List of town tramway systems in Germany
- Trams in Germany
