= Frankenberg Castle (Aachen) =

Coordinates: 50°46′04″N 06°06′14″E

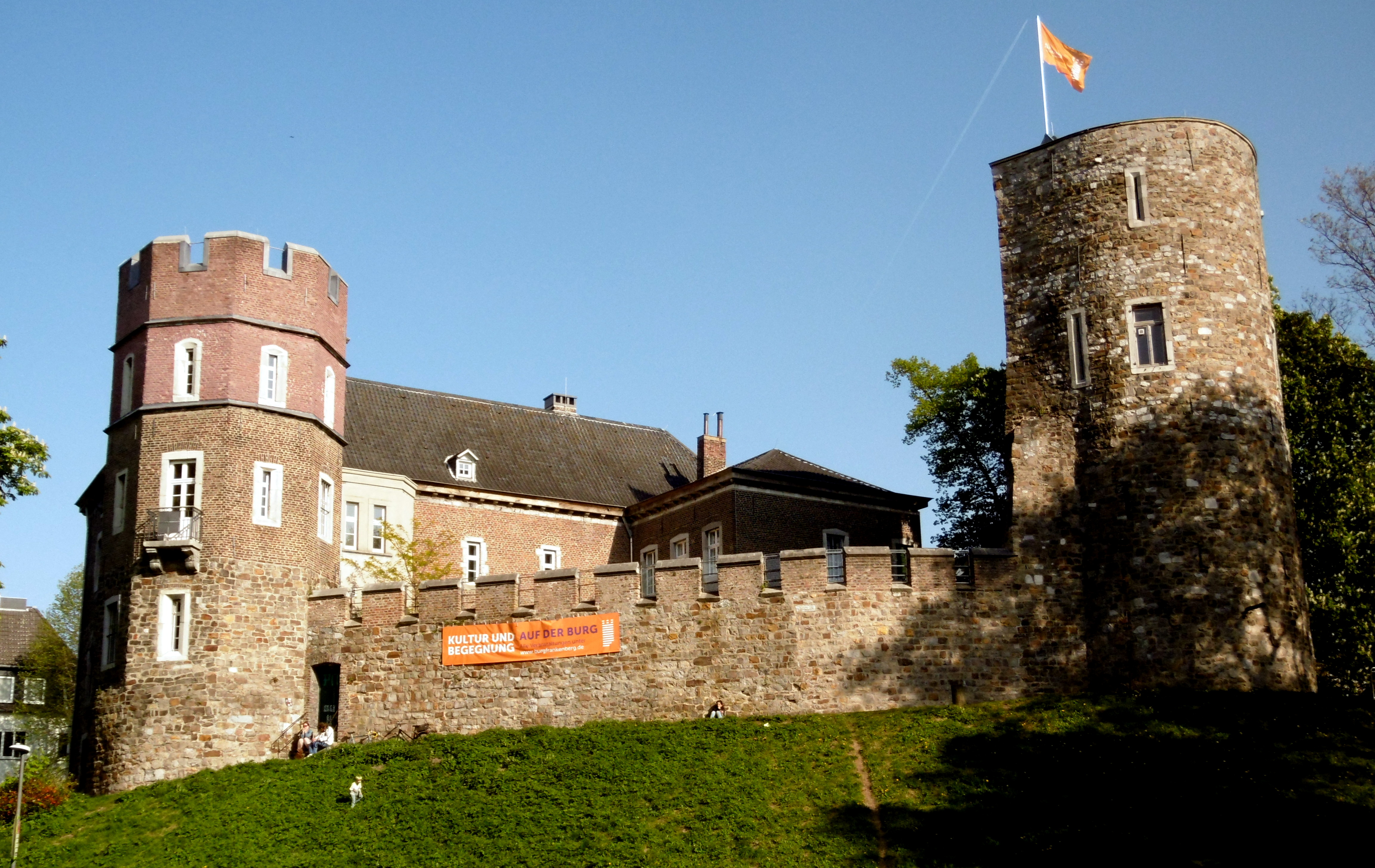
View of the Frankenberg Castle from the northwest

The Frankenberg Castle (in German, Burg Frankenberg, and sometimes spelled Frankenburg) is a castle in the Frankenberg area of Aachen-Mitte, itself a district of Aachen, Germany. Shortly after its construction, the lowland castle became a fief of a Graf (basically equivalent to Count), and later belonged to the Duchy of Jülich-Cleves-Berg.

From 1961 until August 2010 the former water castle housed a museum that documented the history of the Aachen area, from its Stone Age flint mines, through the Roman thermal bath period, up to the Industrial Revolution.

== Place name ==
The place name Frankenberg is derived from a given name, most likely the male given name Franko. The place name is not derived from the name of the Germanic tribe Franks.

== History ==
=== History of residents and owners ===
Historically, the castle was the seat of a Vogt, which was a Holy Roman Empire-era officer responsible for administrative or judicial oversight of the surrounding community. Frankenberg Castle, in particular, was given imperial immediacy over the area surrounding the Burtscheid Abbey. One such Vogt, or local administrator, was Edmund von Merode (Merode being a nearby castle in Langerwehe), whose father Johann von Merode is mentioned in writing from 1306. Edmund’s grandfather Arnold I von Merode is considered to be behind the construction of Frankenberg Castle, which was originally intended to be a fortified residence outside the former fortifications of Aachen.

The castle itself, however, is not mentioned in writing until 1352, and though it was considered to be a well-built water fortress, it was still conquered in 1391 by robber barons from the Schönforst Castle in nearby Forst. This occupation did not last long, as already by 1449, the Frankenberg Castle was already back in possession of the Knight Johann von Merode (also called von Frankenberg).

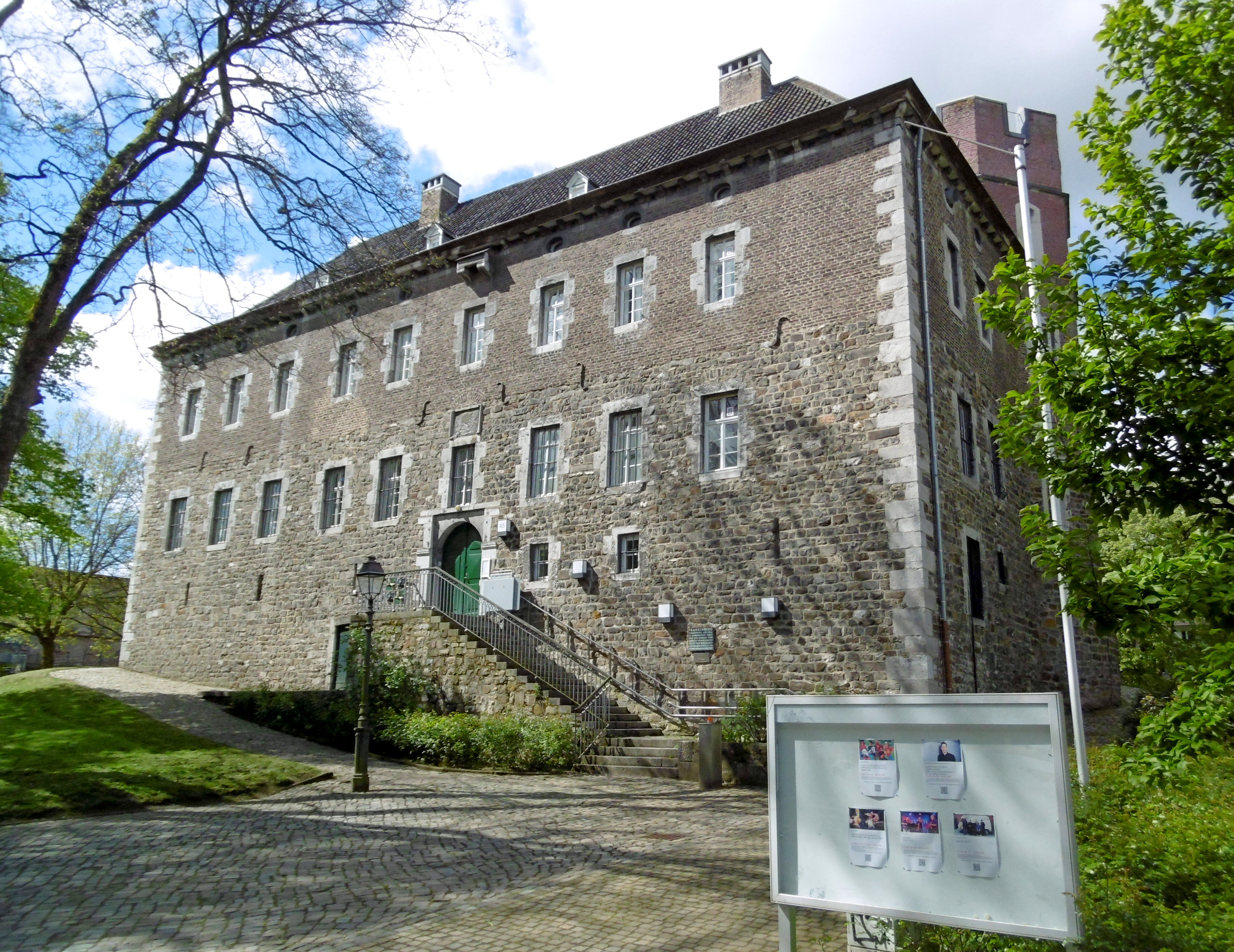
The residential structure of Frankenberg Castle

His descendant Adam III von Merode-Frankenberg fought alongside the Dutch in their fight for independence against the Spanish, and for this reason, Spanish troops partially destroyed Frankenberg Castle in the 1500s. Because Adam III von Merode-Frankenberg, who was the last scion of the Merode-Frankenberg house, was killed during the Spanish capture of the Dutch city of Maastricht before he could father any male offspring, the castle fell and was transferred to his uncle Johann von Merode-Houffalize, as a fief of the duchy of William, Duke of Jülich-Cleves-Berg.

Part of the agreement to allow Johann von Merode-Houffalize to take over the castle was his agreement to repair the ailing building. He, however, did not abide by this, and it was not until his grandson, Johan Dietrich, took over that the structure was rebuilt, beginning in 1637. After his early death, construction was continued by his under-aged son Franz-Ignaz and completed in 1661. At that point, the castle once again became inhabitable.

In 1728 the last of the house of Merode-Houffalize ended in the male-line when Philipp Wilhelm died, and the castle then went to the half-cousin Johann Wilhelm von Merode-Houffalize zu Frenz, who nevertheless chose to continue living at his family’s traditional estate, the nearby Gut Kalkofen. The castle thus was abandoned and fell into ruin.

With the introduction of the French Constitution of 1793, Frankenberg Castle lost its status as a fief of Jülich. In 1827 the last heiress of the Merode family, Baroness Regina Petronella Franziska von Merode-Houffalize zu Frenz, sold the then ruined property to the Aachen City Councilman Friedrich Joseph Freiherr von Coels von der Brügghen for 15,500 Thaler. Between 1834 and 1838, the property underwent comprehensive renovation and modernization.

34 years later the Frankenberger Construction Company purchased the entire complex and built on the surrounding grounds a new residential district, which was subsequently named the Frankenberger Viertel, and by the beginning of the 20th century, the main building of Frankenberg Castle was used as a residence and workstation of the famed engineer and airplane designer Hugo Junkers.

After the building's destruction in World War II and its temporary use as a labor office, planning for the establishment of a regional museum at the complex began September 1961, even before its eventual final reconstruction was finished in 1971. This museum operated until 2010, after which the building went unused until 2012, when plans were set in motion to convert the space into a civil and cultural center.

=== Construction history ===
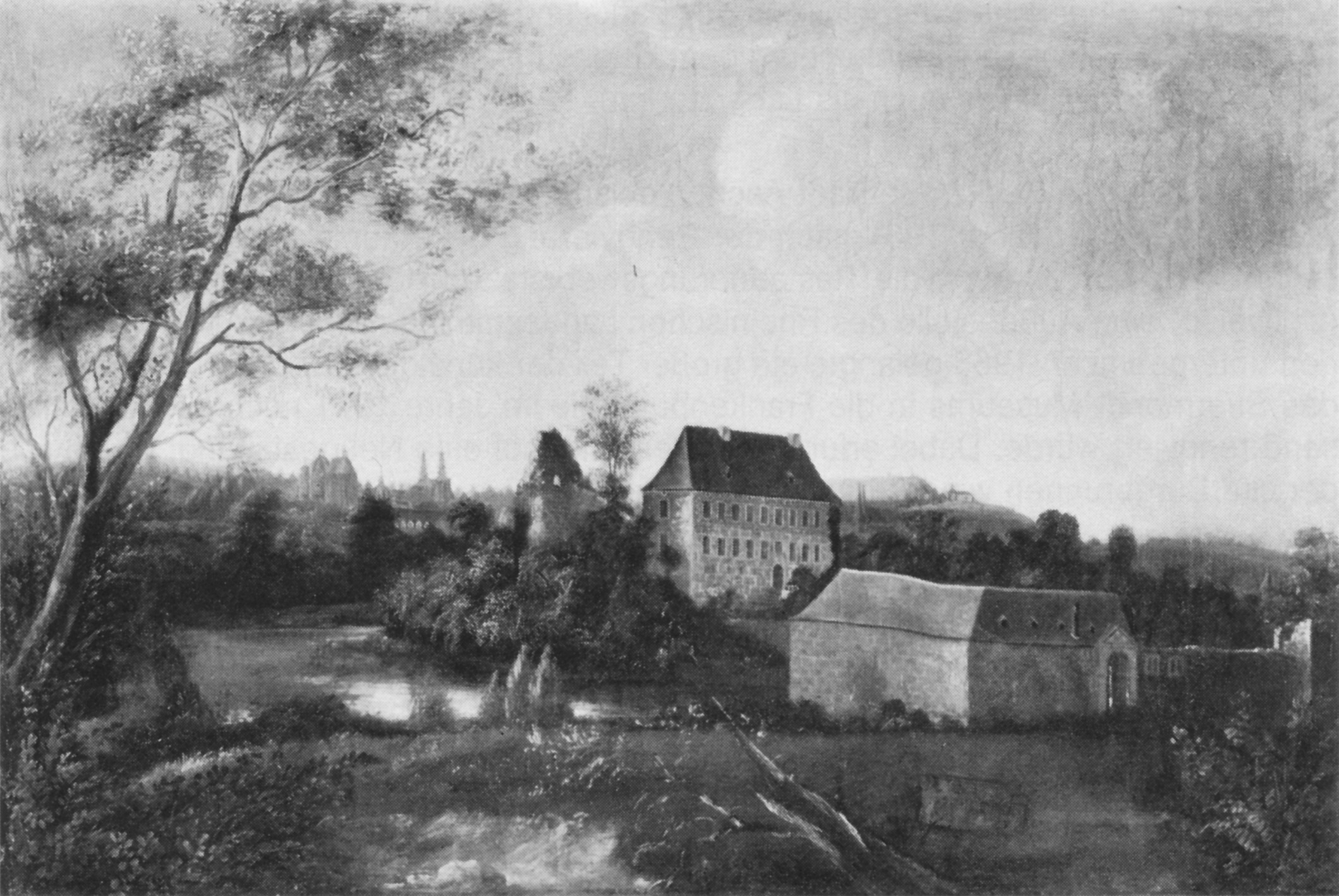
Frankenberg Castle, around 1830. Oil painting by Ludwig Schleiden

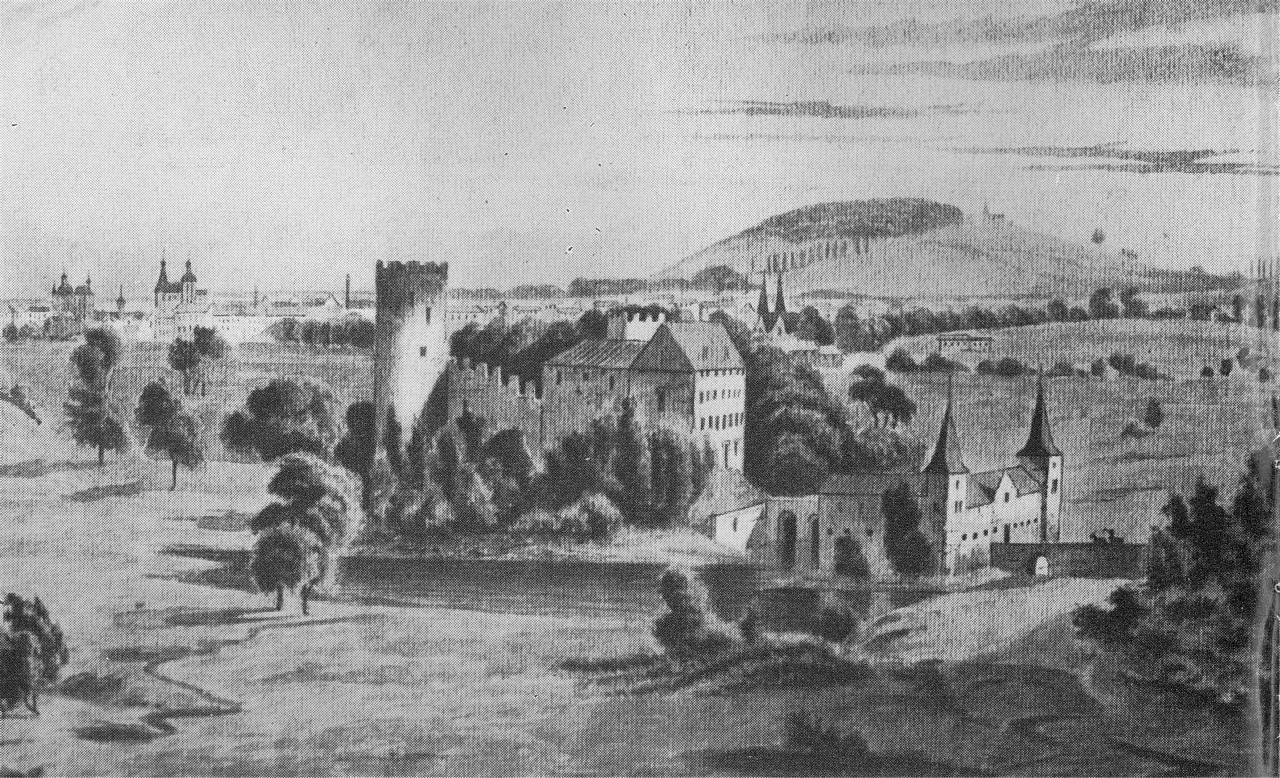
Frankenberg Castle after the 19th-century renovation, but before the demolition of the outer bailey; painting from the 19th century

The belief was long held that Charlemagne ordered the castle to be built (discussed below in the Fastrada Legend section), but research has established that the structure was constructed during the 13th century. Because of this dating, the earlier assumption that the foundation was erected over an ancient Roman watchtower was eventually rejected.

Until the end of the 19th century, the castle consisted of a broad forecastle, a farmyard, and a main castle (which was completely surrounded by water).

Before 1637, there are no records regarding building specifications, and the first mention of the make-up of the castle comes during the 17th-century renovation of the structure by Johann Dietrich von Merode-Houffalize. These records detail the castle's numerous structural defects, noting that the buildings were (with the exception of the Bergfried) without roofs and that many of the walls had collapsed. Makeshift traceries consisting of twigs covered the windows, and numerous beams were rotten. The interior chapel on the second story (like most of the rooms on this floor) could not be entered because of the danger of collapse, which meant that a thorough review of the higher floors was also not possible. Use of the fountain in the main yard of the castle was also impossible because it had filled with rubble.

Thus, it is not surprising that the reparations of the structure took several years to complete, and was not finished until 1661. The family was interested in preserving the existing character of the castle, and so only the chapel was not rebuilt. The manor house itself was completed in a château style.

When Friedrich Josef Antonius von Coels had the castle again renovated between 1834 and 1838, new elements were added that adhered to the prevailing tastes of the time, but which were not part of the original structure. For instance, the towers were reconstructed with new roofs that featured merlons, and the previously partially open main yard was completed enclosed by massive battlements and a wall-walk.

To make room for a new residential district of Aachen, the Frankenberg Construction Company reduced the size of the previously quite large Frankenberg Park that surrounded the castle, and also removed the forecastle and related farmyard.

During the final reconstruction of the castle in 1971, some of the gothic changes made between 1834 and 1838 were removed. Among other things, the over-sized merlons were removed from the Bergfried, and the castle’s main yard was returned to its former location so that the formerly blocked fountain could again be made prominent.

== Description ==
Overview of Frankenberg Castle

The castle grounds are located on a small, natural rocky outcropping and follow a three-corner building plan. On the east side of the compound, the three-story residential structure contains a decorative facade, with the lower levels being made up of rough stone blocks, while the upper floors consist of brick masonry. The corners of the building, as well as its window and doorjambs, are emphasized by light-colored stone, and a staircase leads to the raised ground floor, which contains four embedded embrasures.

Under the building’s eaves on the east-facing façade, there are small, transverse windows, with the exception of directly above the main door, where a bretèche sits just under the roof. Also below the hip roof, numerous curved corbels frame the upper edge of the facade.

The residential portion of the structure has an additional three-story wing that attaches to the main building in the southwest. The northwest corner of the main building is connected to a five-story, eight-cornered tower that is topped by merlons. Like the main building, the lower two floors of the tower are built of rough stone blocks, while the upper floors consist of brick. On the north side of the third story of the tower, there is a small balcony supported by corbels. The transition between the third and fourth and fourth and fifth floors are marked by light-colored stone cornices that circles the entire tower.

An additional four-story, horse-shoe-shaped tower rises on the southwest corner of the castle area. Its wall are entirely made up of rough, natural stones, and on every floor, it contains narrow embrasures surrounded by light-colored stone.

== The Fastrada Legend ==
A legend associated with the castle details how Charlemagne received a magic ring from a snake, after he had passed a judgment that was in the snake's favor. The snake claimed that whoever wore the ring would love Charlemagne forever, and so the emperor gave the ring as a present to his wife Fastrada.

When she died, the emperor’s sadness was so great that he could no longer rule, and the welfare of his subjects was called into question. Finally, the Archbishop Turpin von Reims discovered that Fastrada was still connected to the emperor through the ring, and so he snatched it from her hand and hurled it into the lake of Frankenberg Castle.

Thereafter, Charlemagne was forever connected to the castle, which drew him back again and again to sit beside the water and daydream peacefully.

== Works cited ==
- Hans Feldbusch: Burg Frankenberg (= Rheinische Kunststätten. Heft 1). 2. Auflage. Gesellschaft für Buchdruckerei AG, Neuss 1977, ISBN 3-88094-193-9.
- Karl Emerich Krämer: Die Burtscheider Burg. In: Karl Emerich Krämer: Burgen in und um Aachen. Mercator-Verlag, Duisburg 1984, ISBN 3-87463-113-3, S. 75–78.
- Adam C. Oellers: Führer durch die Burg Frankenberg Aachen. Museum für Stadtgeschichte und Kunstgewerbe. Brimberg, Aachen 1985.
- Christian Quix: Die Frankenburg, insgemein Frankenberg genannt und die Vogtei über Burtscheid. Urlichs, Aachen 1829 (online).
- Mirjam Swistun, Sandra Fritsch: Die Burg Frankenberg. Projektübung an der RWTH Aachen, Aachen 2005 (PDF, 208 KB]).
