= Rothe Erde =

- Stadtteil of Aachen
- Interactive map of Rothe Erde
- Location within Germany Location within North Rhine-Westphalia
- Coordinates: 50°46′35″N 6°7′20″E
- Country: Germany
- State: North Rhine-Westphalia
- District: Aachen-Mitte
- City: Aachen

Area
  - Total: 1.64 km^{2} (0.63 sq mi)
- Elevation: 175 m (574 ft)

Population (2020-12-31)
  - Total: 2,625
  - Density: 1,600/km^{2} (4,150/sq mi)
- Time zone: UTC+01:00 (CET)
  - Summer (DST): UTC+02:00 (CEST)
- Postal codes: 52068
- Dialling codes: 0241

Rothe Erde is a district of Aachen, Germany with large-scale development in heavy industry. It is sub-district 34 of the Aachen-Mitte Stadtbezirk (which is roughly equivalent to a city borough). It lies between the districts of Forst and Eilendorf.

== History and economy ==
Rothe Erde is a historically important center for the steel industry. In 1845 the Wallonian Jacques Piedboeuf, together with Hugo Jakob Talbot and the mechanical engineers Johann Leonhard Neuman and Theodor Esser, founded the steelworks OHG Piedboeuf & Co, Aachener Walz- und Hammerwerk on the site of a former estate. It remained until being taken over in 1851 by Carl Ruëtz, from which point it continued as the Kommanditgesellschaft Carl Ruëtz & Co – Aachener Hütten-Aktien-Verein Rothe Erde. Carl Ruëtz purchased the former Paulinen steelworks in Dortmund in 1861, renaming it Rothe Erde Dortmund and handing the Aachen works over to mining industrialist Adolph Kirdorf.

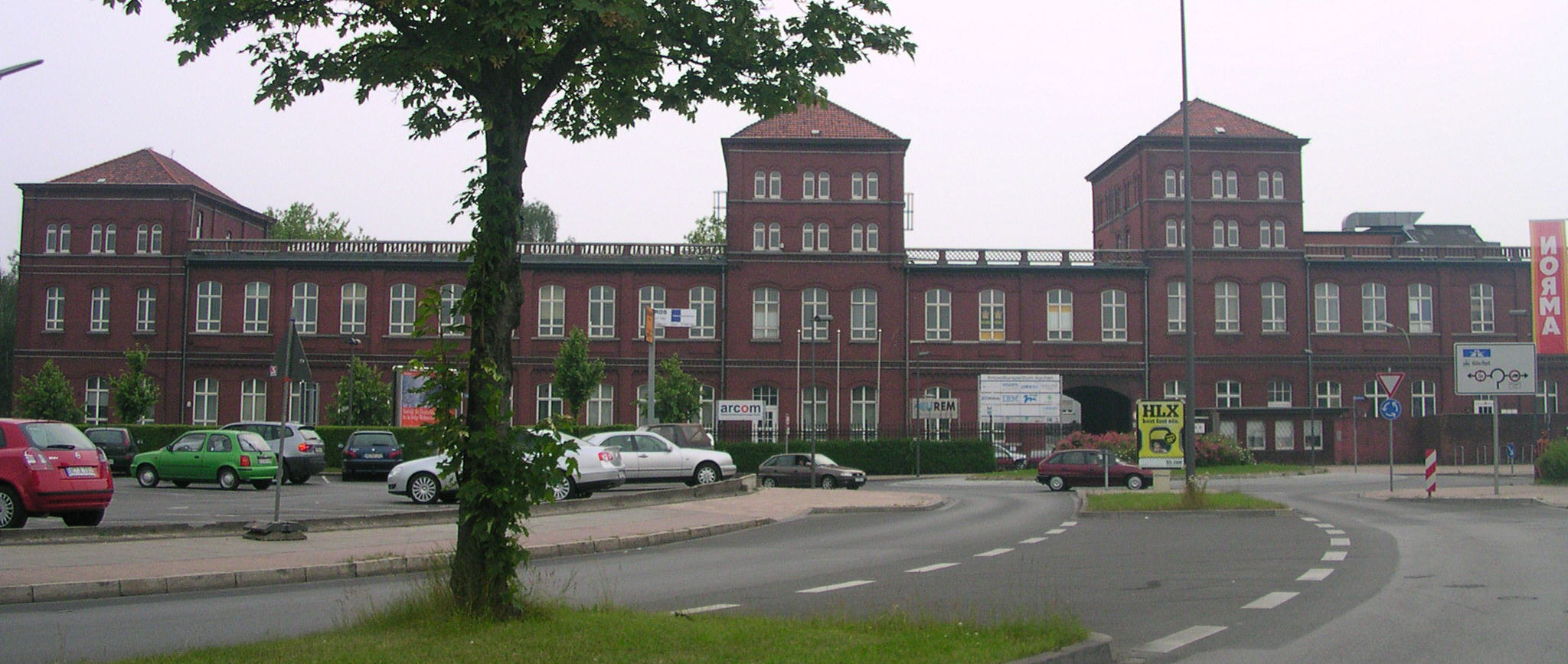
Former administrative building of the steelworks

Because there was no blast furnace in Rothe Erde in which iron ore could be smelted, Kirdorf purchased several blast furnaces in 1892, as well as several coal operations in Esch-sur-Alzette, Luxembourg, which at the time belonged to the German Customs Union (Zollverein), and in Audun-le-Tiche, Lorraine, which had been part of the German Reich since 1871. He obtained coal and coke supplies from the Gelsenkirchener Bergwerks-AG mine, where his brother Emil worked as the director of sales. Kirdorf's strategy paid off and even though by 1887 the company was first among German steelworks, having produced roughly 500,000 tons of rough steel, by 1890 this figure had risen to over a million steel ingots produced.

On 1 January 1905, the steelworks entered into a partnership with the Schalker Verein steelworks, which ended in a formal merger between the two in 1907 under the Gelsenkirchener Bergwerks-AG mine. In 1906 the Eschweiler Drahtfabrik, which produced wire, was also acquired after incurring serious damage as a result of a flood along the Inde River.

After the First World War, with the subsequent collapse of the commodities market, the breakdown of mills and mines in the Lorraine, the exit of Luxembourg from the German Customs Union, and the loss of markets in eastern Germany resulting from Allied occupation of the Rhineland, Kirdorf was pressured to sell the Aachen-based company to the French-Belgium-Luxembourger consortium Société Métallurgique des Terres Rouges, operating under the leadership of the Luxembourger steel concern ARBED. In 1926 the factory site was decommissioned and demolished.

From the waste product of smelting, phosphate slag was being converted into fertilizer as early as 1886 in a separate slag mill. About 150,000 tons of phosphate meal were produced for agriculture there annually. After the closure of the mill, the remaining slag mounds were acquired by a local businessman to be used in sports venues around Europe under the name of Original Aachener Rothe Erde, including the Berlin Olympic Stadium built in 1936 and the former stadium of Borussia Dortmund, known as the Stadion Rote Erde.

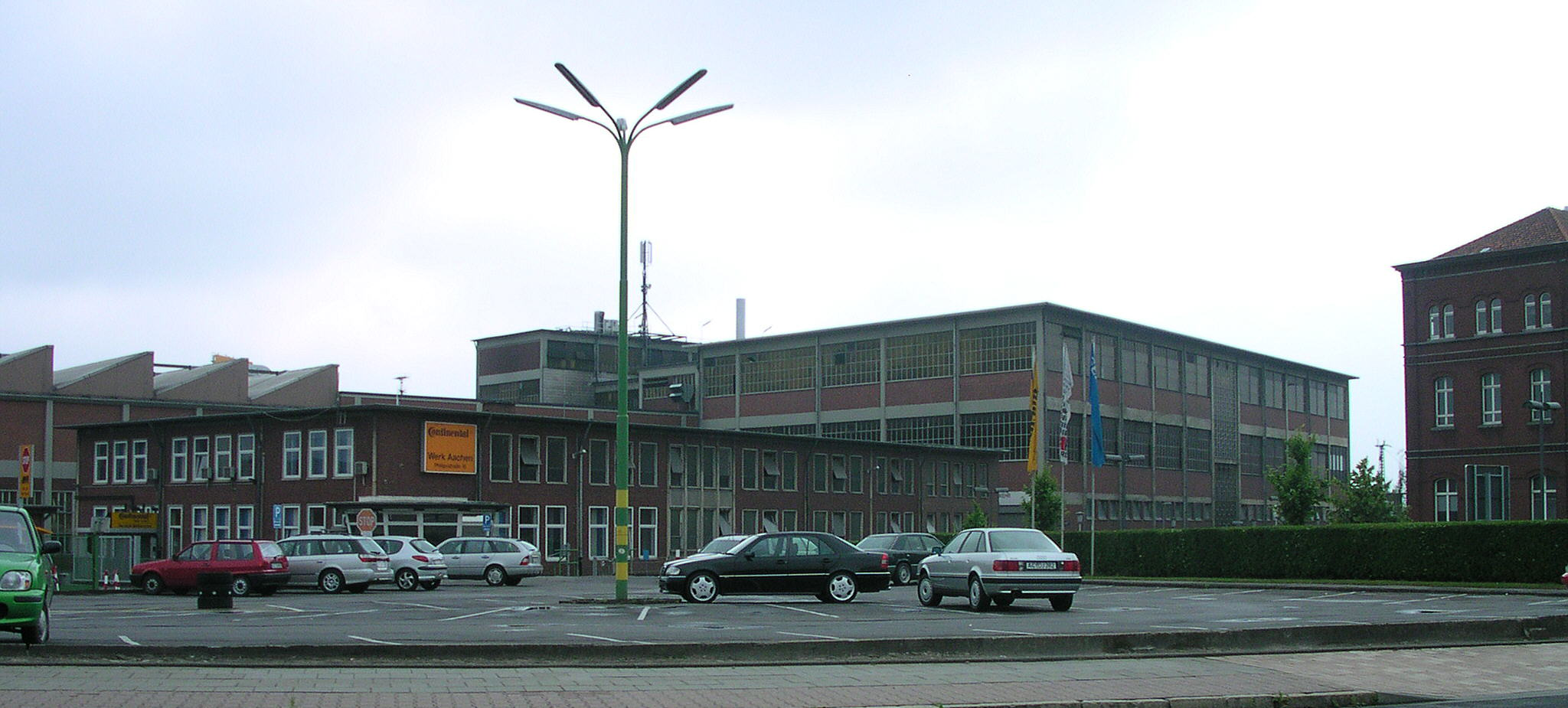
Continental Aachen-Rothe Erde

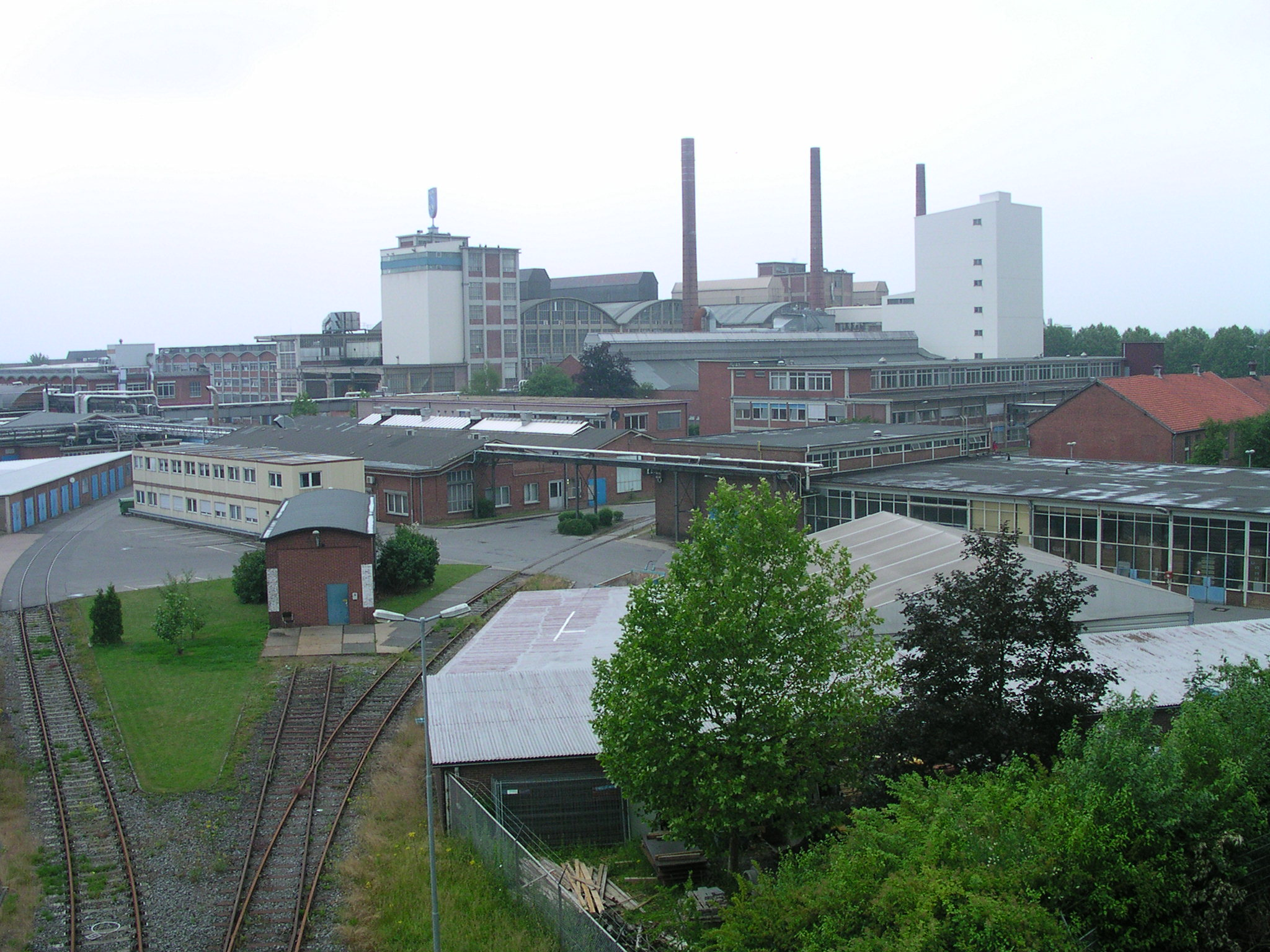
Philips Aachen – Rothe Erde

On the grounds of the smelting works, the tire manufacturer O. Englebert Fils & Co. was established in 1929, merging in 1958 with Uniroyal under the name Uniroyal Engelbert Deutschland AG. After its takeover by Continental AG, the headquarters were moved to Hanover, but a production plant for tires remained in Rothe Erde. In 2009, the former administrative building was auctioned off to the highest bidder, and is used today by a variety of commercial endeavors.

In 1949, the construction of the Rothe Erde industrial park began. The German division of Philips established an incandescent light and glass factory there, having taken over picture tube production in the area in 1954. Beginning around the turn of the century, and after Philips underwent changes to its operation, the industrial park Rothe Erde began to be used by a multitude of diverse businesses.

== Religion ==
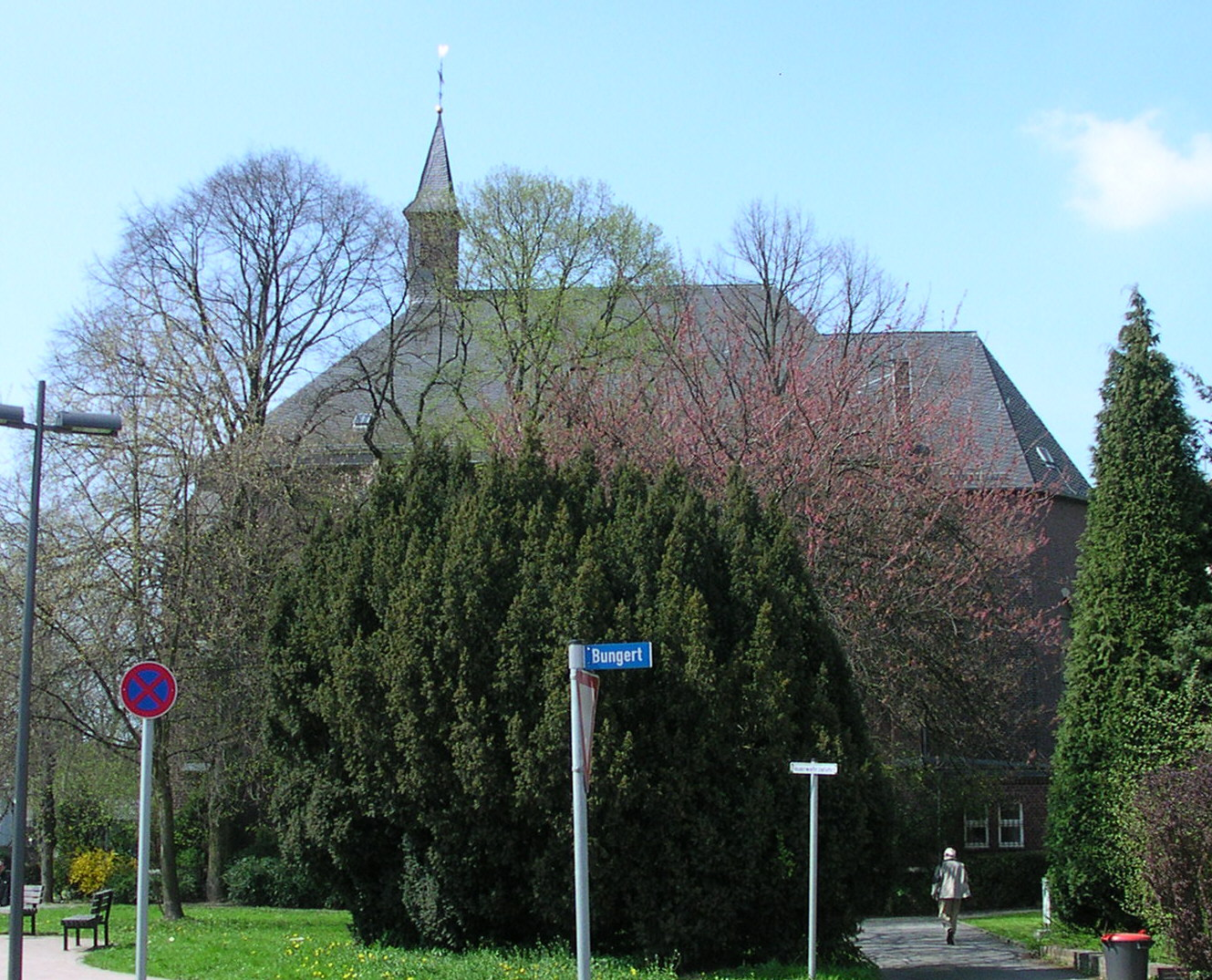
St. Barbara - Rothe Erde

In the last quarter of the 19th century, Rothe Erde grew fourfold. The majority of residents there were Catholic, and thus it became necessary to establish its own parish. This was done in 1901 with the establishment of the St Barbara Parish, named for the patron saint of miners and ironworkers. This heavy industry formerly endemic to the area is remembered today at the church through a display of coats of arms at the church. Prior to this, there had existed a small chapel at the Kleine Rothe Erde estate since 1731, which was consecrated in 1735 at the behest of the auxiliary bishop in Cologne.

On 31 December 2003 the statistical district of Rothe Erde was made up of 164 hectares and was home to 2,634 residents, with 31% of those born in other countries. About 1,300 people in Rothe Erde are members of the Catholic Church.

== Transportation ==
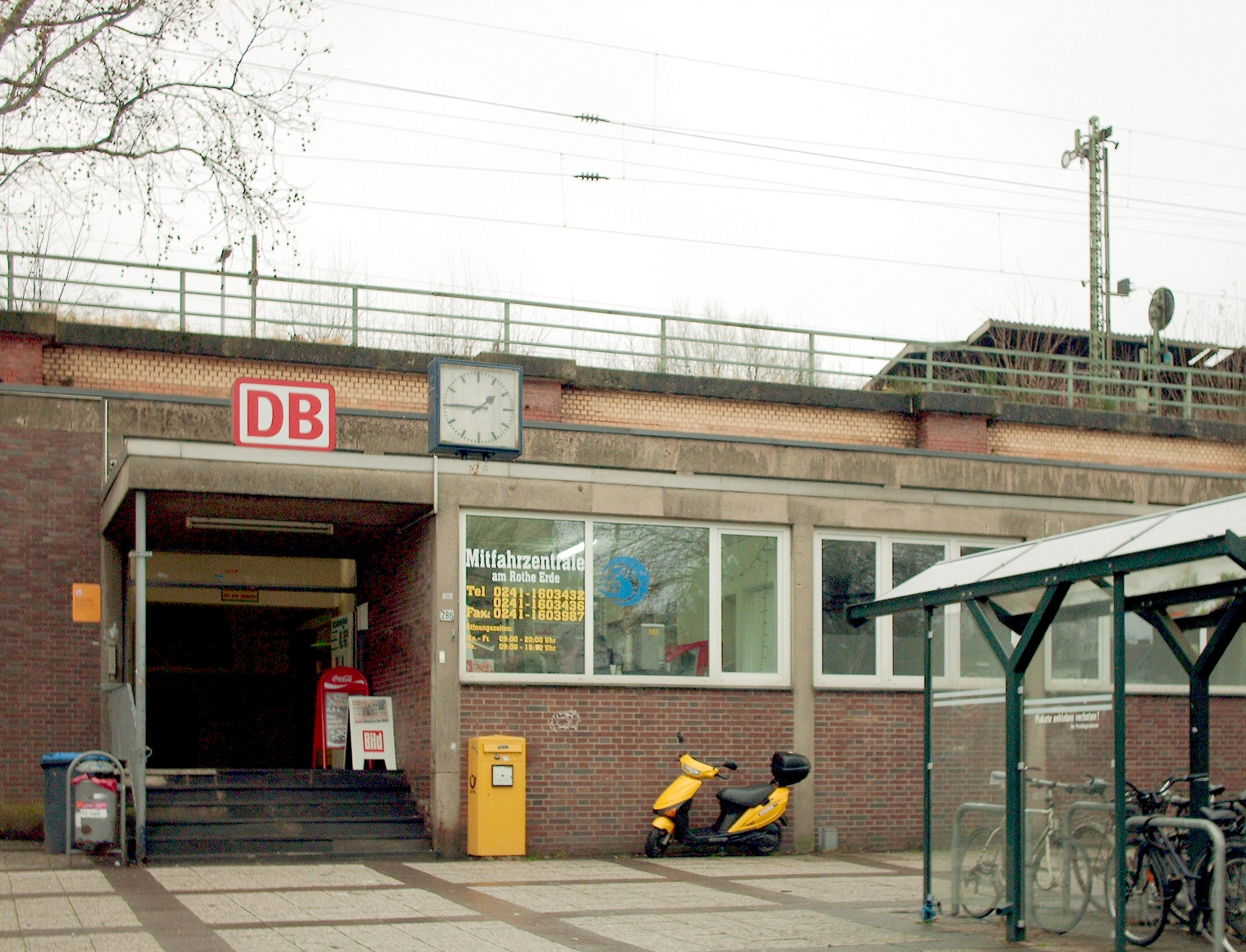
Bahnhof Rothe Erde before its renovation

The nearest train station is the Aachen-Rothe Erde station. The nearest Autobahn on-ramp is in Brand, connecting both to the Bundesautobahn 44 and Bundesautobahn 544.

== Works cited ==
- Michael Käding: Rot(h)e Erden. In: Paul Thomes (Hrsg.): Rohstoffbasis und Absatzmarkt. Die Schwerindustrie des Großherzogtums Luxemburgs und das Aachener Revier (= Aachener Studien zur Wirtschafts- und Sozialgeschichte. Bd. 2). Shaker, Aachen 2005, ISBN 3-8322-4310-0, S. 13–20.
- Michael Käding: Geschichte des Aachener Hütten-Aktien-Vereins Rothe Erde. In: Paul Thomes (Hrsg.): Rohstoffbasis und Absatzmarkt. Die Schwerindustrie des Großherzogtums Luxemburgs und das Aachener Revier (= Aachener Studien zur Wirtschafts- und Sozialgeschichte. Bd. 2). Shaker, Aachen 2005, ISBN 3-8322-4310-0, S. 83–142.
