= Computermuseum Aachen =

Former computer museum in Aachen, Germany

Coordinates: 50°46′59.5″N 6°2′51.9″E

- Established: 1987
- Dissolved: 2009
- Location: Sommerfeldstrasse No. 32, Aachen
- Type: Computer museum
- Website: histech.rwth-aachen.de at the Wayback Machine (archived 2007-06-09)

Computermuseum Aachen was a computer museum in Aachen, Germany from 1987 to 2009. It was created in cooperation with the Rogowski Institute for Electrical Engineering of the RWTH Aachen University. It was housed in the RWTH's "Campus Melaten" until the demolition of the building at Sommerfeldstrasse No. 32, Aachen.

== Overview ==
The museum was created in cooperation with the Rogowski Institute for Electrical Engineering at the RWTH Aachen and collected obsolete computer hardware from them as pieces for the museum. The main advocate and supporter was Walter Ameling (1926–2010).

The extensive collection, which was created in 1965 with the support of the state North Rhine-Westphalia, the German Research Foundation and the Friends of Aachen University, was one of the earliest of its kind in Germany.

The computer museum saw itself as an active museum in which visitors could work on numerous computing devices and PCs themselves and gain experience with the electronic data processing technology of the past. The computer museum was established in 1987 at the RWTH extension site in Melaten and closed at the end of 2009. From 1987 to 1993 the museum was directed by the historian Peter Johannes Droste.

== Exhibits ==
The showpiece of the exhibition was a 1958 Zuse Z22 computer system collected from the RWTH.

Some of the exhibits:

- Burroughs 1700
- DEC PDP-11/45
- DEC PDP-12
- EAI 8800 Scientific Computing System
- EAI PACE 231R
- EAI TR-48
- IBM 421
- IBM System/3 Model 10 (5410)
- IBM System/360-20
- LGP-30
- Siemens 2002
- Telefunken RA 463/2
- Telefunken TR 4
- Zuse Z22

== Closure ==
The building that housed the computer museum had to be demolished in 2010 as part of the repurposing of the Melaten campus. For this reason, the museum had to close at the end of 2009, and all the exhibits had to be moved to new locations.

As early as 2006, the museum's backhaul holdings were dissolved and initially deposited in Castrop-Rauxel. From there, financed by SAP, a large part of the collection went to the Computer History Museum (CHM) at Mountain View, California (the so-called SAP collection). This included Mulby computers from Aachen production (Krantz Computer). The remaining devices were taken to a warehouse on the premises of Dortmund train station (Tillmann collection). There, the parts were badly damaged due to poor storage and were threatened of being scrapped in 2012. Private collectors managed to save and restore many artefacts. Some exhibits can now be found in the Rechenwerk Computer- & Technikmuseum Halle.

Another part from the Aachen inventory was stored by a forwarding agency in Cologne. The costs for this were covered by the CHM until 2007/2008. After that, individual artefacts were saved by collectors, the rest were scrapped.

After the closure at the end of 2009, the remaining exhibits were temporarily stored at RWTH premises and distributed to other museums in 2012, in particular to the Konrad-Zuse-Computermuseum in Hoyerswerda and to the museum in Bautzen. The latter also received the Z22. Some of the earlier exhibits were shredded.
