= Sibylle Keupen =

German politician

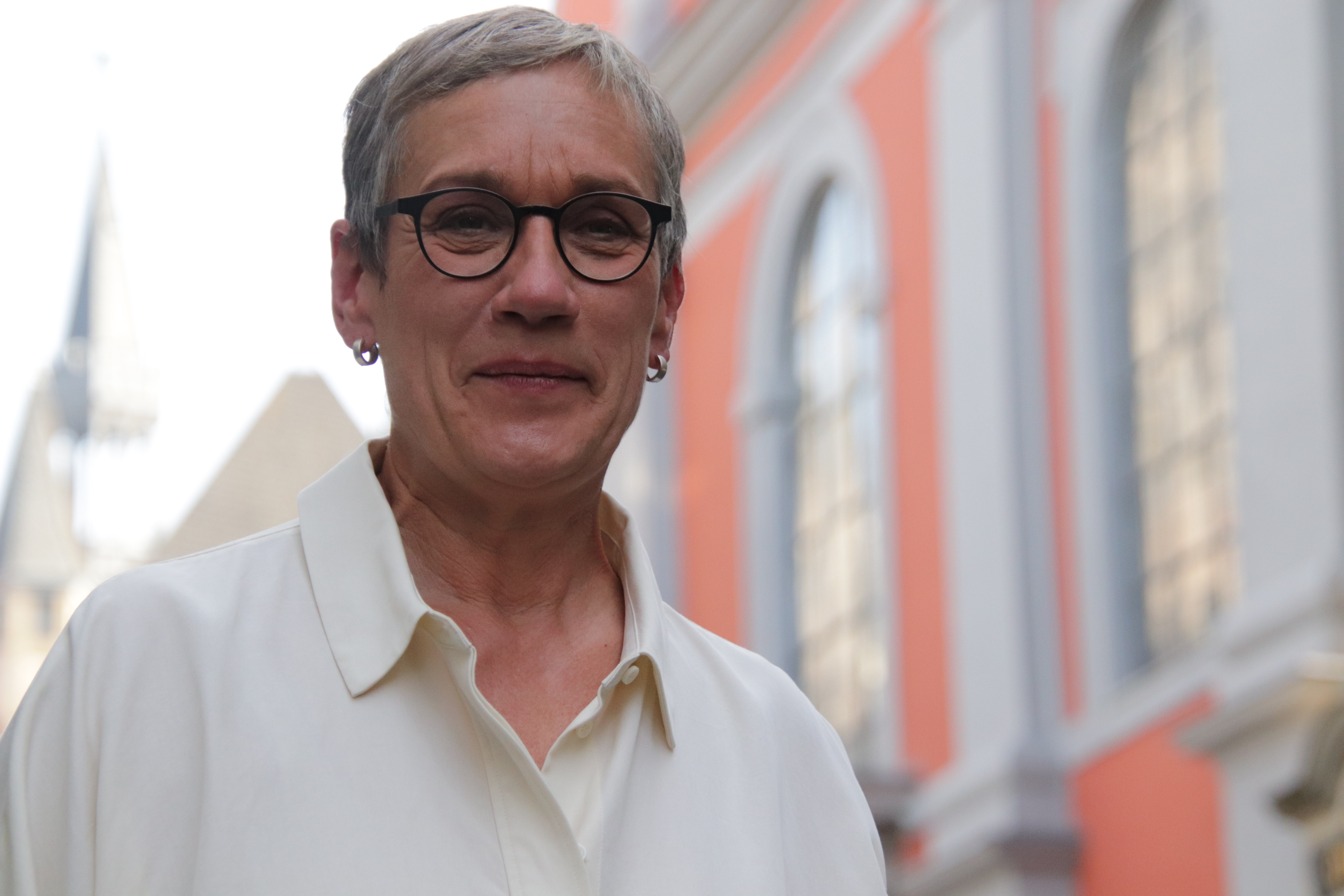
- Born: March 14, 1963 (age 63); Mayen, West Germany
- Citizenship: Germany
- Education: University of Trier
- Years active: 1987 - present
- Employer: City of Aachen
- Title: Mayor of Aachen
- Term: 2020 - 2025
- Predecessor: Marcel Philipp, CDU
- Successor: Michael Ziemons, CDU
- Spouse: Yes
- Children: 2 adult sons
- Website: aachen.de/de/stadt_buerger/oberbuergermeisterin

Sibylle Keupen (born 14 March 1963 in Mayen) is a German politician (non-party, close to the Green Party) and a qualified pedagogue. She has been the Lord Mayor of Aachen from November 1, 2020 to September 28, 2025, when she lost the election to Michael Ziemons.

== Education and personal life ==
During 1982-83 she studied Pedagogy and Social sciences at the University of Bonn and in 1987 she graduated from University of Trier, specializing in Pedagogy and Social sciences.

Sibylle Keupen is married, she has two adult sons and lives in Herzogenrath, district of Aachen.

== Work ==
Since her youth, she has been active for many years as a volunteer in a Catholic youth association with a focus on political education and women's work. She later worked as an actress and theater pedagogue in the independent theater scene. In 1994 she took over the management of the Bleiberger factory in Aachen. In 1997 she founded the youth art school there and was responsible for the development and expansion of innovative concepts and projects in cultural education. During this time she completed advanced training in solution-oriented consulting according to Steve de Shazer as a consultant for prevention work in the field of child protection for the Roman Catholic Diocese of Aachen. Since 2012 she has been responsible for training honorary staff and for developing institutional protection concepts.

In 2017, the general assembly of the Federal Association of Youth Art Schools and Cultural Education Institutions elected Keupen as deputy chairman. In addition, she is the chairwoman of the Prevention and Child Welfare Committee for the Federal Association for Cultural Education for Children and Young People and chairwoman of the women's network and spokeswoman for the network for continuing education in the Aachen city region.

== See also ==
- List of mayors of Aachen
