= Ponttor =

Coordinates: 50°46′53.50″N 06°04′42″E

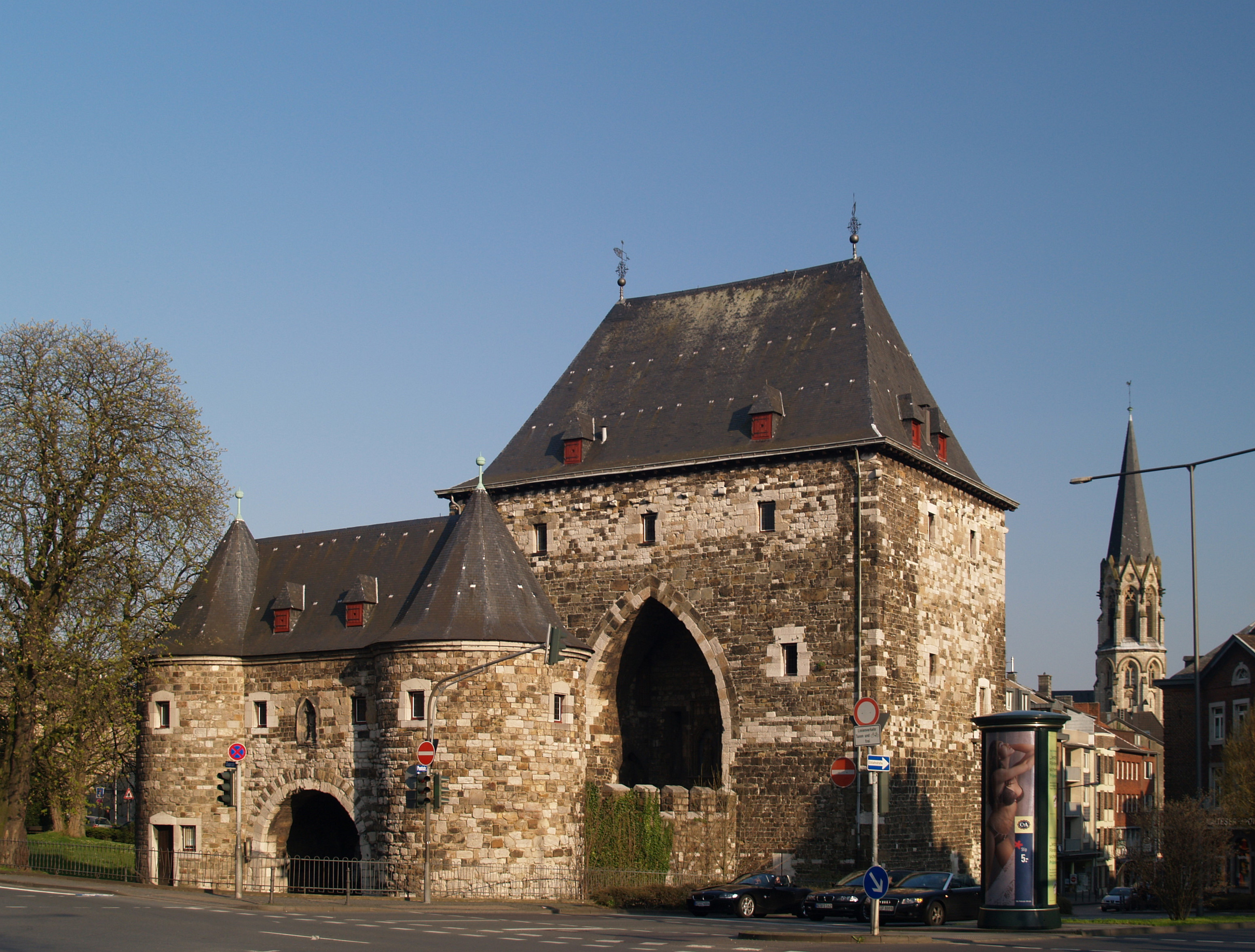
Ponttor with foregate

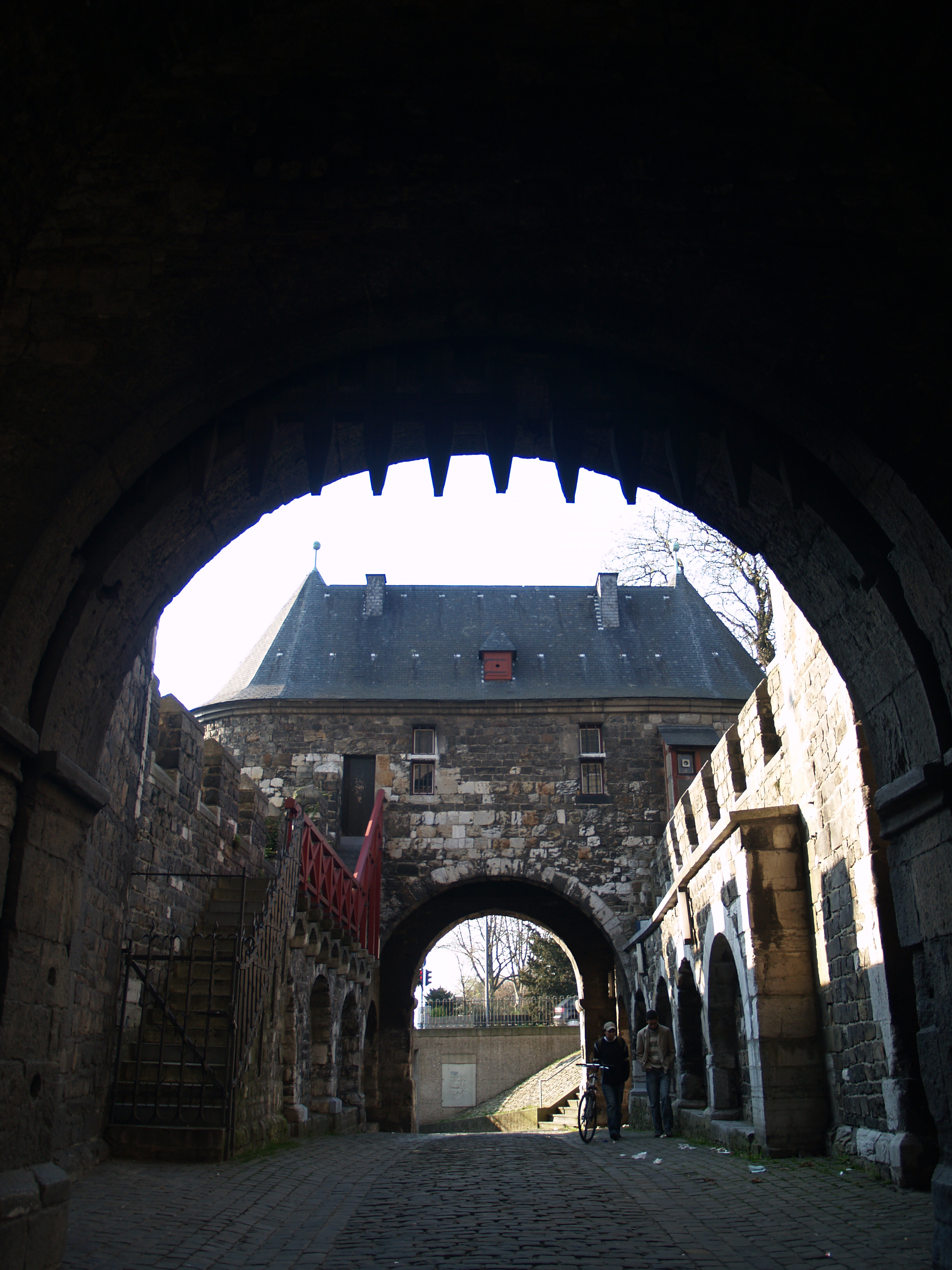
View inside the foregate

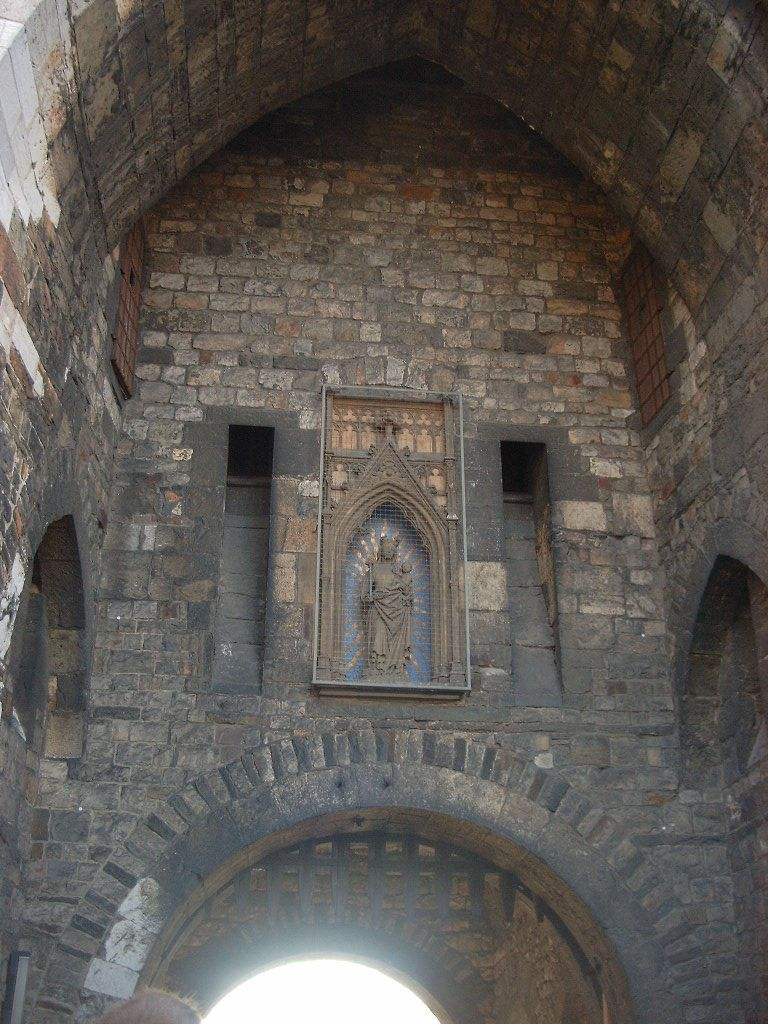
Statue of Mary, patron saint of the main gate, embedded in the arch

The Ponttor in Aachen, Germany, (known in the 17th and 18th centuries as the Brückenpforte or Brückenthor) is one of the two remaining gates of the original city wall of Aachen (the other being the Marschiertor). The westernmost of the north-facing gates (the other being the Sandkaultor, which no longer exists), the Ponttor was built in the 14th century and manned by soldiers and militia throughout the Free Imperial City of Aachen era. Today, the Ponttor is used by German Youth and Scout groups belonging to the German Scout Club (1945) and the German Scout Association Saint George.

== Structure ==
The Ponttor was constructed as a right-angled three-stock tower castle. In the main entrance, there is a Portcullis as well as a machicolation, through which things could be dropped on invading forces. A bridge passage with crenelations spanned a moat and was strengthened in the foregate with two reinforced towers (barbicans). The building material was Devonian sandstone, Pennsylvanian carbonite sandstone and quartzite, with the framing material made of light bluestone.

Ponttor boasts some remarkable architectural features characteristic for medieval military architecture. Built mostly out of local blue limestone and sandstone blocks, it comprises twin towers standing at approximately 25 meters high flanking either side with an arched gateway running between them.

The interior consists mainly of three levels including vaulted halls on each level within both towers. Each tower has loopholes allowing defenders to launch projectiles at attackers while staying protected behind thick stone walls.

Above the archway are machicolations – openings through which hot oil or rocks could be dropped onto enemies attempting to breach the gate below – adding another layer to this formidable defense system.

Atop sits battlements providing further protection for soldiers patrolling along wall-walks linking towers together.

== Explanation of the name ==
Though it is true that Aachen has many rivers and streams that pass through it, none are in the vicinity of the Ponttor, the name for which is assumed to come from the Latin word "pons", meaning bridge. However, before the gate was named, the area of the city (as well as the area's main street) already carried this appellation, and thus the city gate is simply named for the area around it. The neighborhood received the name because of a bridge, as during Ancient Roman times, a fortification existed on what is today known as the Annuntiaten stream. Beyond this area lay extensive swamps, and to exit the settlement, one would have to cross a bridge. Later settlements that were built in the area beyond the fortification were said to be beyond the bridge, and from this, the area, street, and city gate all got their names.

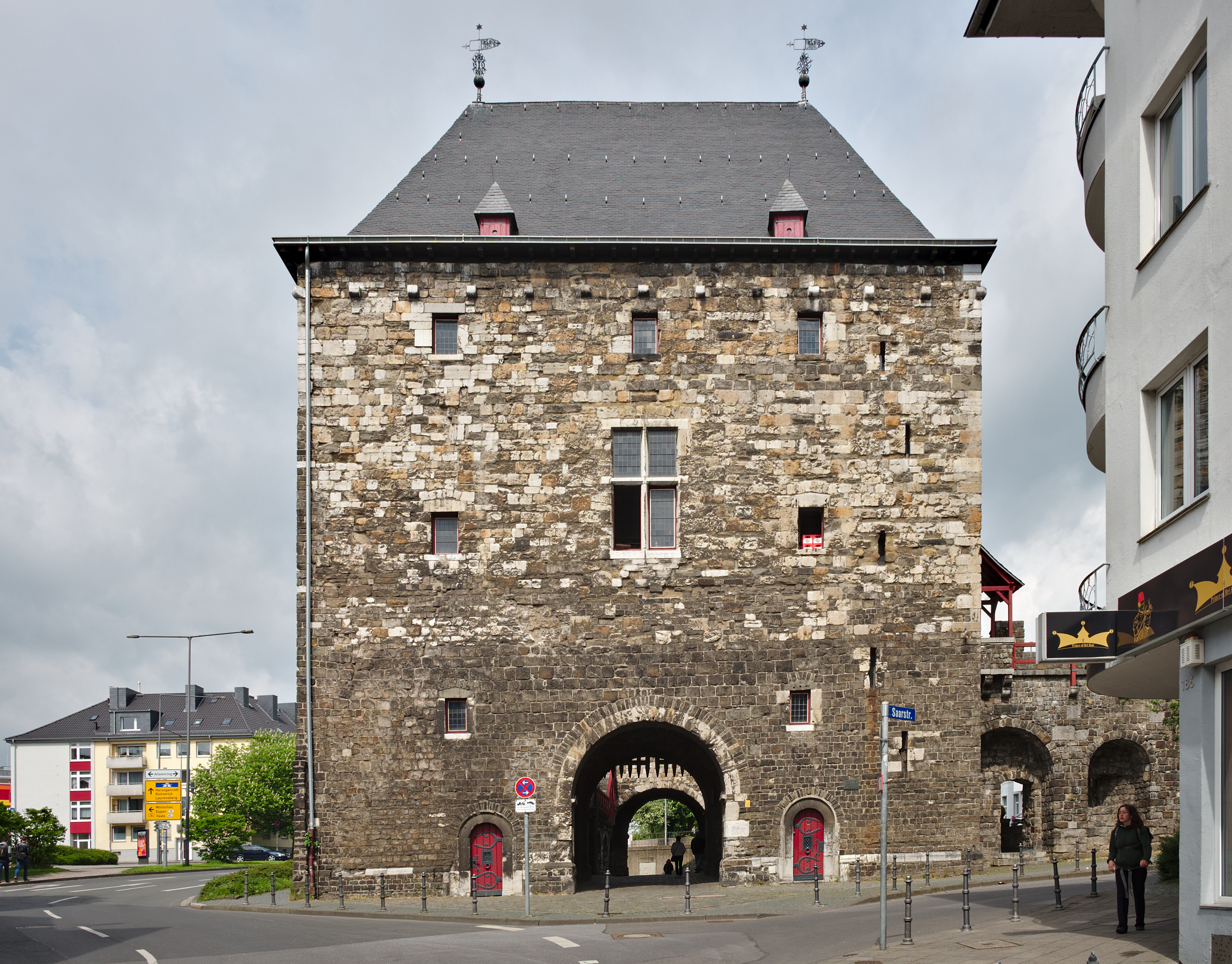
Inner city side (south)

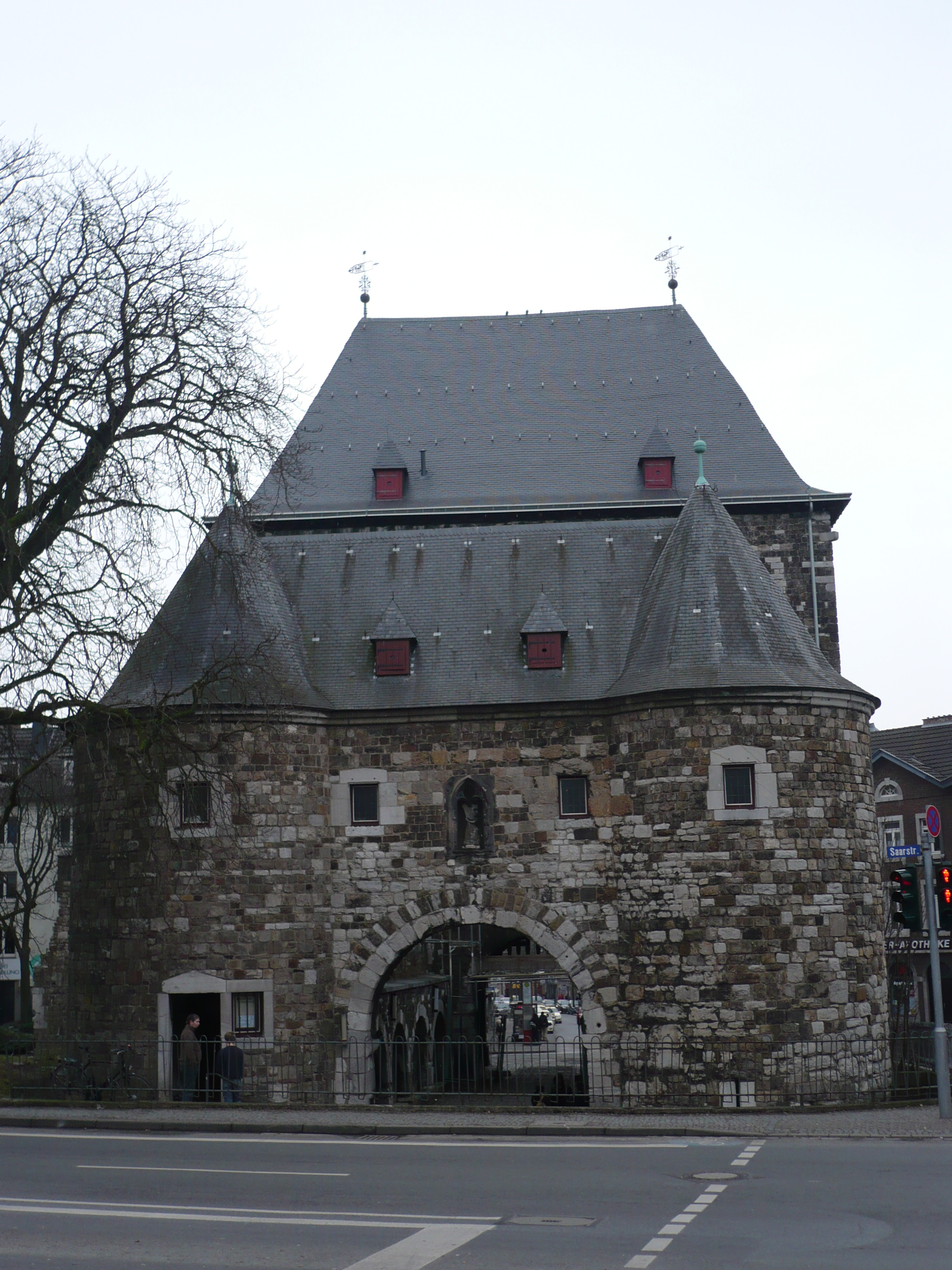
Outer city side (north)

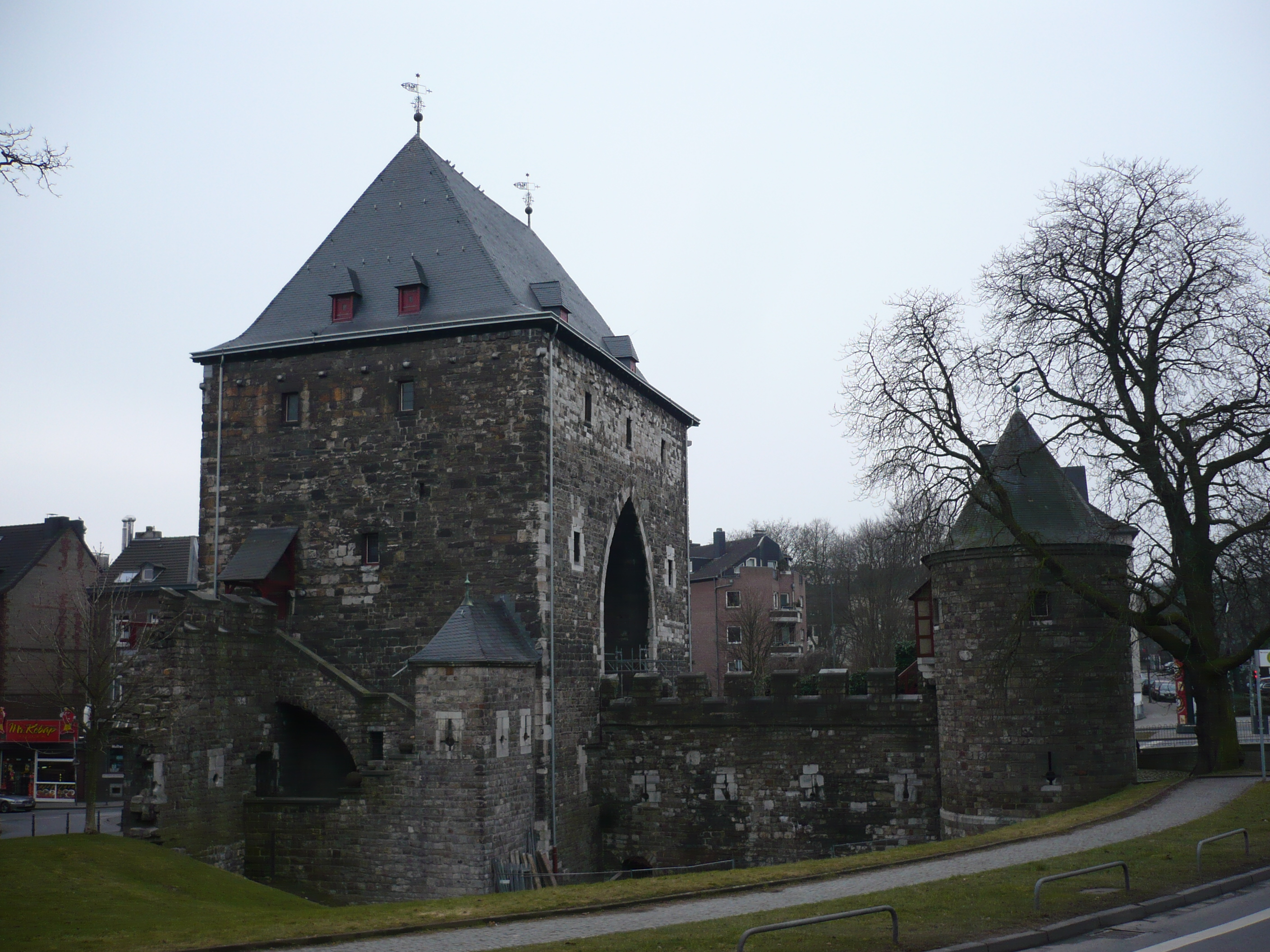
View from the east

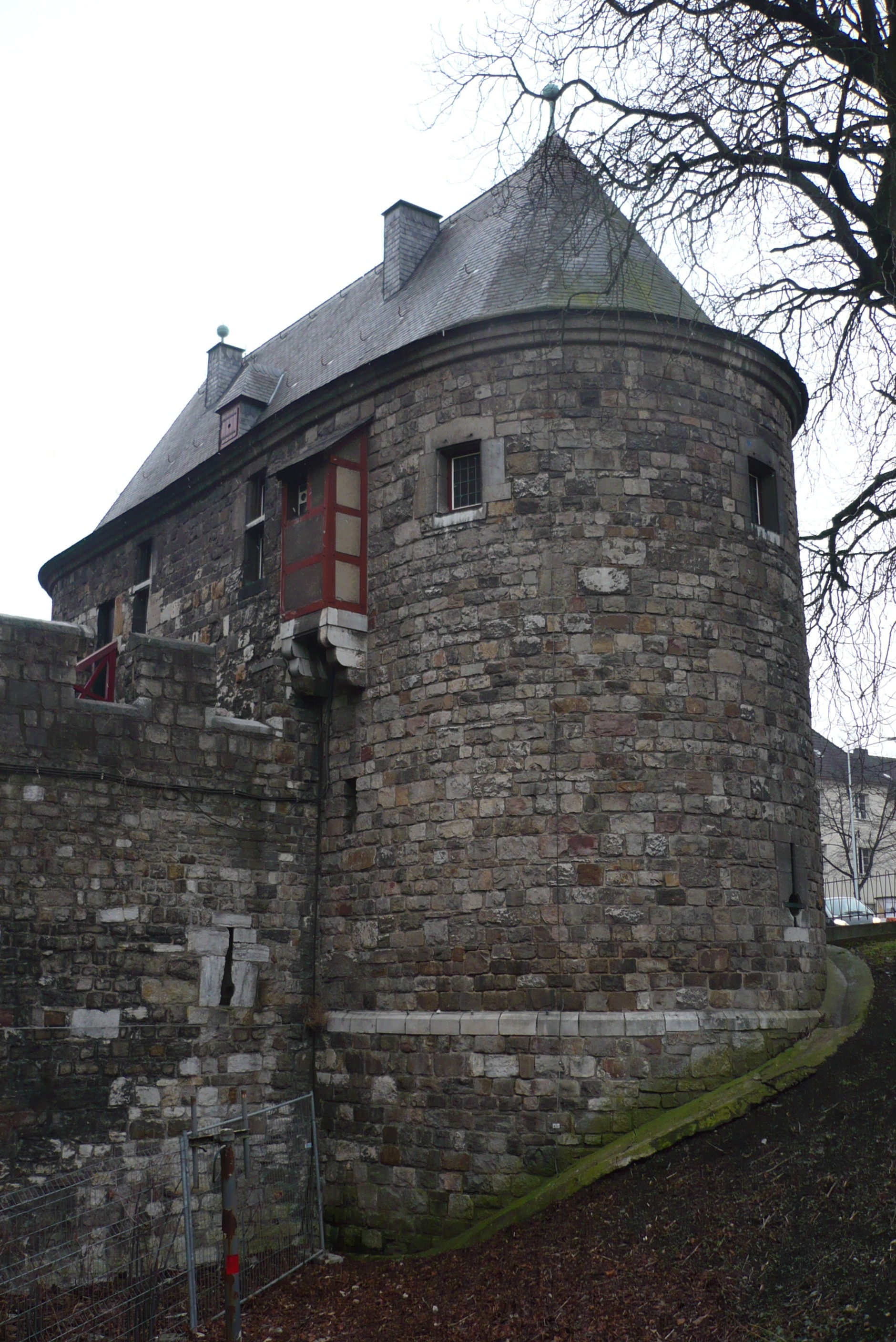
Forecastle, view from the east

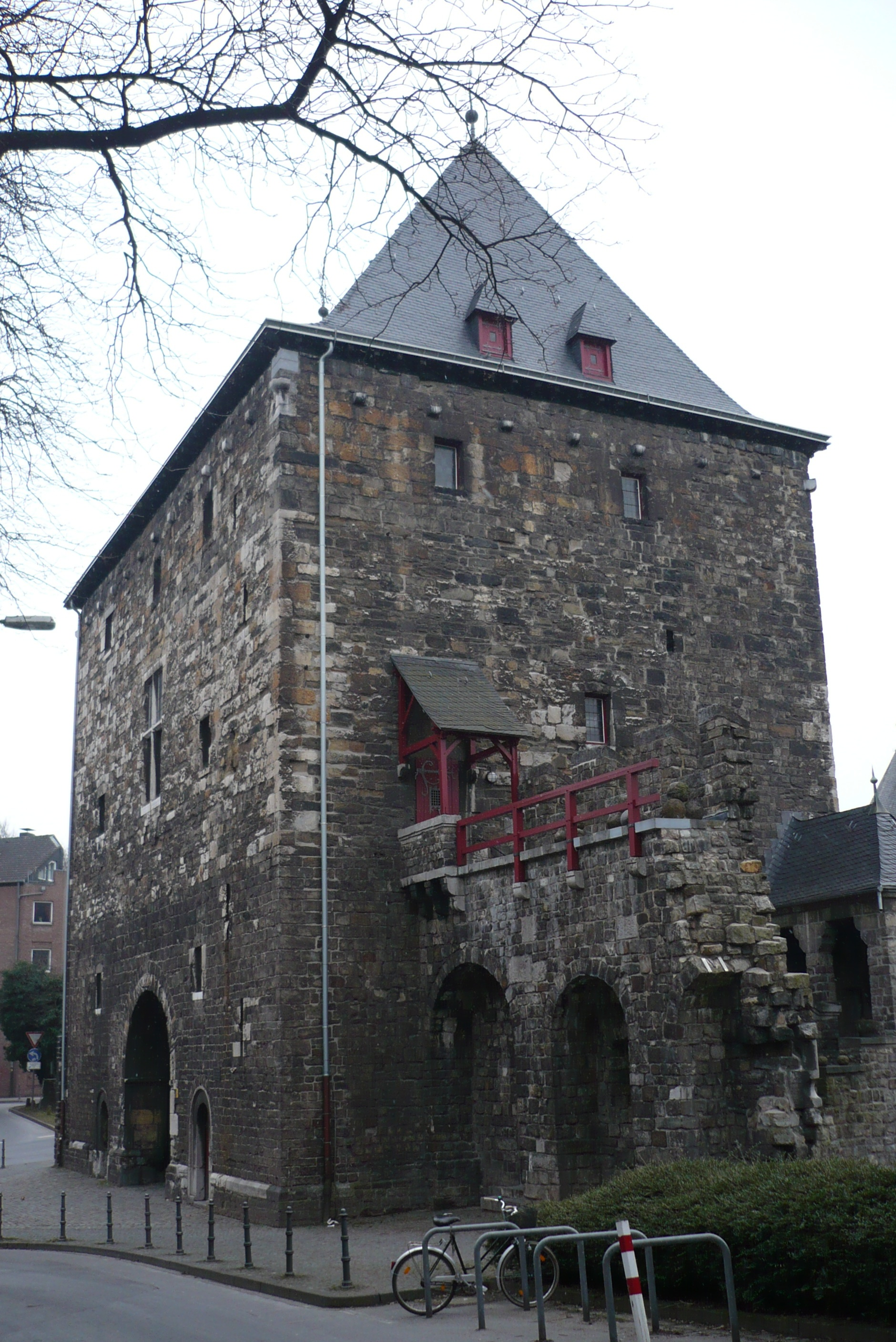
approach along the former wall in the south east

== Works cited ==
- Bruno Lerho (2006). Die große Aachener Stadtmauer mit Toren und Türmen. Aachen: Helios Verlag. ISBN 3-938208-37-6.
- C. Rhoen (1894). Die Befestigungswerke der freien Reichsstadt Aachen. Aachen: Verlag von Anton Creutzer. (Online-Version, pdf, 6.61MB).
