= Burtscheid Abbey =

German monastery

Coordinates: 50°45′47″N 6°05′36″E

Imperial Abbey of Burtscheid Abtei Burtscheid
- 1138–1802
- Coat of arms

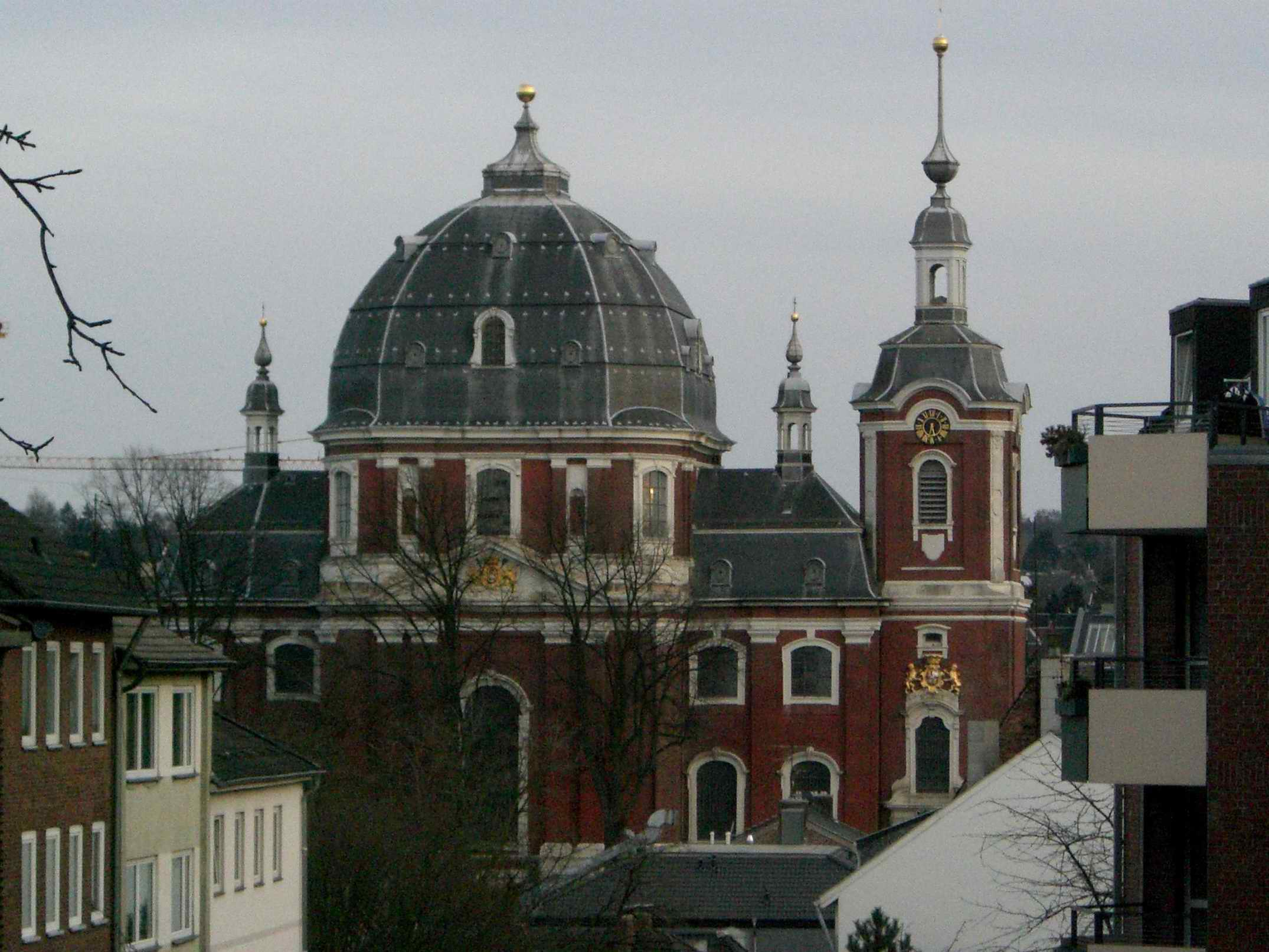
- Burtscheid Abbey church
- Status: Imperial Abbey
- Capital: Burtscheid Abbey
- Common languages: Moselle Franconian
- Government: Theocracy
- Historical era: Middle Ages
  - Founded by Benedictines: 997
  - Made Reichsfrei: 1138
  - Taken over by Cistercians, immediacy confirmed: 1220
  - Purchased its own Vogtei: 1649
  - Established gambling house: 1779
  - Occupied by France: 1792, 1794–1804
  - Secularised to France: 1802
  - Awarded to Prussia: 1815
Preceded by	Succeeded by
County of Jülich	Roer (department); Cisrhenian Republic
- Today part of: Germany

Burtscheid Abbey (German: Abtei Burtscheid) was a Benedictine monastery, after 1220 a Cistercian nunnery, located at Burtscheid, near Aachen, North Rhine-Westphalia, in Germany.

== History ==
The abbey was founded in 997 under Emperor Otto III. The first abbot, Gregor, who came to Burtscheid from Calabria, is sometimes said to have been the brother of Theophanu, Byzantine mother of the Emperor. He was buried beneath the altar after his death in 999, and his date of death, 4 November, was kept as a feast day until the dissolution of the abbey.

In 1018 the Emperor Henry II endowed it with the surrounding territory. Also at about this time the monastery was raised to the status of an abbey, and the dedication was changed from Saints Nicholas and Apollinaris to Saints John the Baptist and Nicholas.

In 1138, the abbey was made reichsfrei by Conrad III, being granted Imperial immediacy, the privilege of being subject only to the Holy Roman Emperor, rather than to an intermediate lord. The abbey was under the Vogtei (loosely "protectorship") of the Barony of Mérode until the abbey purchased its Vogtei from them, in 1649.

In 1220, under Emperor Frederick II and his chancellor, Archbishop Engelbert of Cologne, the Benedictines were evicted and replaced by Cistercian nuns who had previously been living at the Salvatorberg in Aachen, to whom the abbey's possessions were transferred. At the same time the abbey's reichsfreiheit was confirmed.

The abbey church was rebuilt in the mid-14th century, and again between 1735 and 1754 by the architect J.J. Couven.

In 1779, despite the refusal of permission by the council of Aachen, who by that time were responsible for local government in Burtscheid, the then abbess introduced a gambling house, and the street is still known today as Kasinostrasse.

Burtscheid was occupied by French troops in December 1792, and finally conquered while the Flanders Campaign September 1794, and in August 1802 secularised and dissolved.

The remaining abbey buildings are now used by a school and for residential and administrative purposes.
