= Burtscheid =

Quarter of Aachen, Germany

Coordinates: 50°45′56″N 6°06′44″E

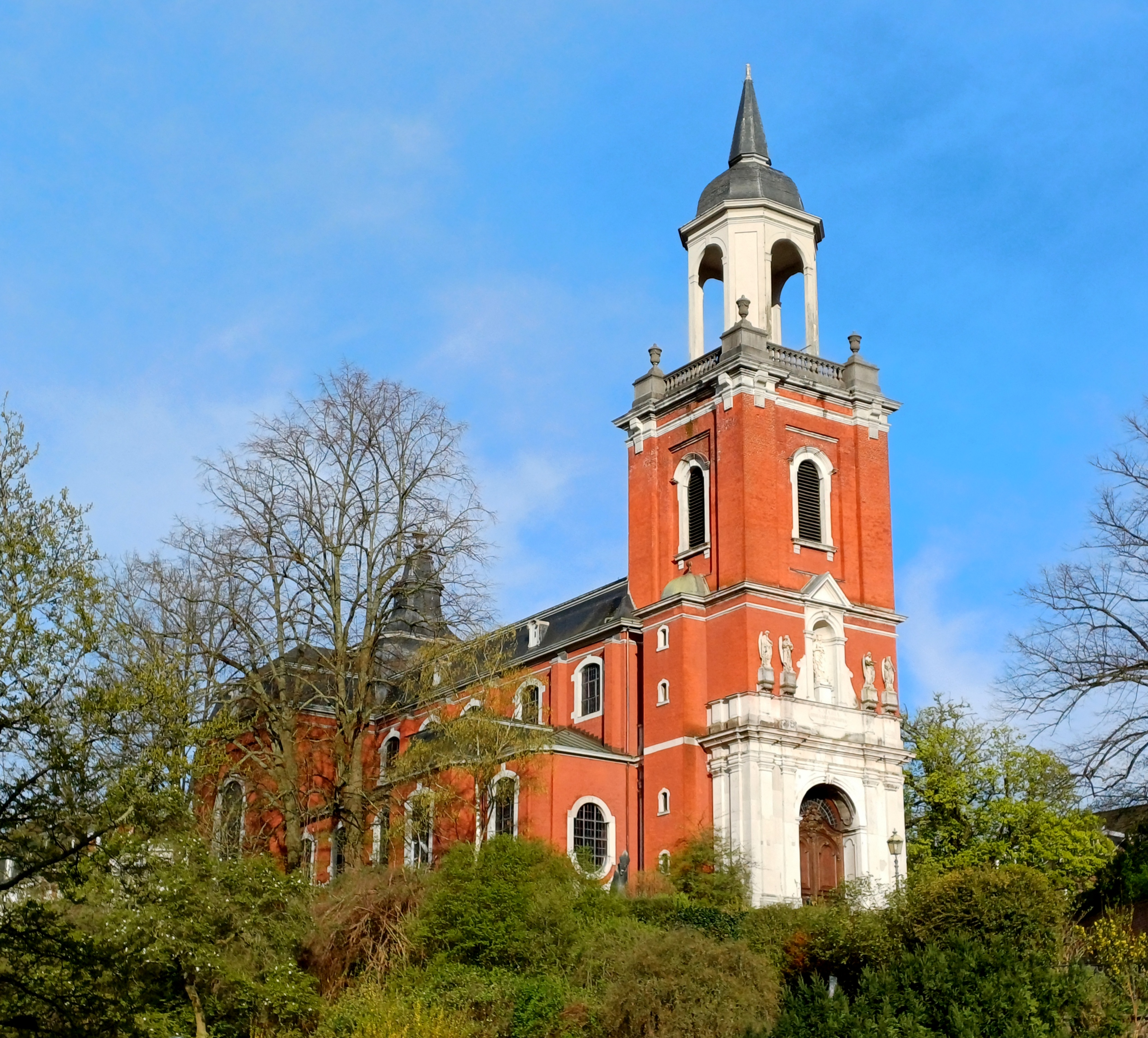
St Michaels church

Burtscheid (Latin: Porcetum) is a district of the city of Aachen, part of the Aachen-Mitte Stadtbezirk. It is a health resort.

== History ==
It was inhabited since ancient times by Celts and Romans, who were attracted by the presence of hot springs.

While Roman presence, about 150 AD, Burtscheid and Aachen settlements developed together, but in 3rd century, the Burtscheid settlements were abandoned.

Burtscheid Abbey was founded there in 997 by emperor Otto III, with Gregor von Burtscheid as its first abbot. It was finished in 1016–1018. In this context, the medieval town Burtscheid developed separately from Aachen.

From 1816 Burtscheid was the administrative capital of the district of Aachen. While the furter 19th century, the settlement areas and industrial zones of Aachen and Burtscheid grew together. Also water supply of separate Burtscheid became difficult. Therefore, a treaty was negotiated regarding the merger of the cities, which came into effect on 1 April 1897.

During World War II, the German Nazis established and operated a forced labour camp in the district.

== Notable people ==
- Egidius Jünger (born 1833), Second Bishop of Seattle
- Armin Laschet (born 1961), German politician (CDU)
- Kurt Johnen (1884–1965), German music writer
