= Kurt Malangré =

German politician and lawyer (1934–2018)

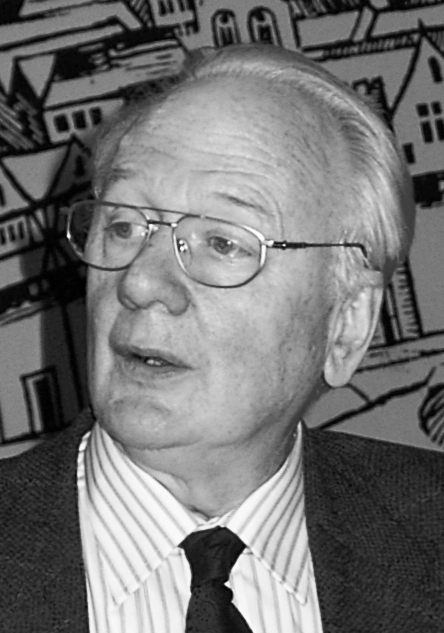
Kurt Malangré, 1999

Kurt Malangré (18 September 1934 – 4 October 2018) was a German politician and lawyer from Aachen. A member of the CDU, he served as Lord Mayor of Aachen from 1973 to 1989 and as a Member of the European Parliament from 1979 to 1999.

Malangré belonged to a family of Wallonian origin that moved from Belgium to Stolberg in the mid 19th century. He studied law and became an attorney, and started his political career in November 1969 when he became a member of Aachen's city council. In 1972 he was elected Mayor of Aachen, and from 1973–1989 he served as Lord Mayor. From 1979 to 1999 he was also Member of the European Parliament.

Malangré was a supernumerary member of Opus Dei. For his dedication for the good of the city and its citizens he was appointed honorary citizen of Aachen in 2004.

Malangré died on 4 October 2018 at the age of 84.
