= Textile industry in Aachen =

Fabric industry of Germany

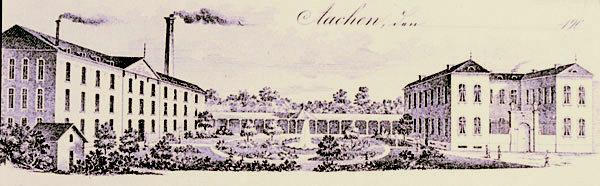
Kelleter cloth mill in Aachen, c. 1808

The textile industry in Aachen has a history that dates back to the Middle Ages. The Imperial city of Aachen was the main woolen center of the Rhineland. Certain kind of woolens made there were illustrated as "Aachen fine cloth" (German: Aachener Feintuche). These high-quality fine woolens have a plain weave structure using carded merino wool yarns, and a raised surface. The production of high-quality, fine cloth required fine foreign wool and skilled craftsmen and was reserved for town craftsmen. It involved regulated steps including sorting, combing, washing, spinning, fulling, dyeing, shearing, and pressing the wool. The finished products were inspected and authorized with a town trademark before being sold and exported. Fine cloth was a major export in the Middle Ages.

The city's industrial importance stemmed from its status as a center of high-quality cloth production. Aachen textile manufacturing went through different phases, from rural craft and domestic production to organised forms of industry. It has gone through many ups and downs. In contrast to neighboring cities, Aachen could not adapt to changing times, socioeconomic conditions, and technology, which led to the gradual decline of its manufacturing sector in the early modern period, despite the city's great heritage and craftsmanship in the textile industry.

== History ==
Aachen is reported to have "thousand year old tradition as a cloth city", which has had a significant effect on the reputation of the textiles made there.

After the decline of the Middle Ages, many of Aachen's artisans and merchants seemed resistant to adopting the technological and social changes that were occurring throughout western Europe. During the late Middle Ages, Aachen was one of Europe's main industrial centers for making woolen cloth. However, in the early modern period, it could not keep its status and compete with England and other rival centers because of its rigid guild institutions and illiberal political structure. The preindustrial production was a blend of artisan production and a domestic system.

The Aachen fine cloth industry flourished until guilds seized control, after which it deteriorated gradually. The putting out system with domestic spinning and weaving was founded in the guild-free cities of Eupen, Montjoie (Monschau), Burtscheid, and Vaals at the end of the 17th century. The amount of raw wool increased by 30% during the peak year of 1680, and shearers were believed to have produced more in a single year than in the past five. Aachen had 80 shearmen, 100 master weavers, and 300 looms in 1705; By 1735, the number had more than doubled, with 140 shearmen, 200 weavers, and 600 looms. However, during the 1770 slump, one-fifth of the traditionally working people in the wool trade went unemployed.

=== Early history ===
The city of Aachen experienced significant political and economic growth throughout its history, propelled mainly by the various industries that emerged around the local springs. These industries included the operation of spas, the manufacture of needles, and the textile industry.

It is supposed that the tradition of cloth manufacturing in Aachen dates back to the reign of Charlemagne. The abundant supply of water near the city favored the growth of textiles. Aachen was renowned for lime-free water and the warm springs that were helpful in various textile manufacturing stages, such as dyeing and finishing the fabric. The city offered better connectivity as it was situated on a Roman-built east-west road system, and it also had easy access to wool from nearby farms.

- 12th century

A preoccupation with the textile industry resulted in the formation of a local cloth manufacturing industry that serves consumers from outside the near vicinity. By the 12th century, Aachen cloth was sold in Osnabrück and Hildesheim. Aachen's woolen trade gained fame over the next three centuries. They followed in the footsteps of their Flemish "masters", focusing on products that had already established their worth at the legendary medieval fair. Those products include many variations such as "Gray" and "brown" fabrics, "bombassins" (blended with half cotton), "bays" (half worsted), "says", "Arras" (unfulled woolen), and "Berry cloth". A total of seven thousand pieces were produced in a year from all these materials. By the 15th century, Aachen's fabrics had found their way into markets as far away as Hungary, the Baltic region, Russia, and Provence.

The development of the manufacturing sector inevitably led to a more complex division of labor. By this time, the groups and individuals involved in the wool trade, including shearmen, fullers, spinners, weavers, dyers, accessory suppliers, and all those involved in manufacture, had grown to be well-known in the city of Aachen. The influx of foreign artisans and merchants increased Aachen's already rising population; Lombards and Jews were among them. This gradient inevitably gave birth to newer systems and problems in Aachen.

=== Guild organisation ===
- 13th century to 16th century

In the 13th century, the Wollenambacht became the dominant guild after a slow start and incorporated nearly all woolen trades. Following a sluggish start in the 13th century, it grew over the next 100 years, reaching its peak in the second half of the 15th century and the first half of the 16th century.

The guild, as the primary industry, played a significant role in the political system of Aachen. Over time, the power of the guild and the city became intertwined. The aristocratic oligarchy in Aachen fiercely protected their right to appoint members to the guild, which fueled resentment among the common people towards the authorities, particularly feudal landlords and wealthy merchants. The craftsmen rebelled due to dissatisfaction with the oligarchs' management of the city and guilds. However, the underlying cause was the concentration of power and wealth, and the lack of rights for craftsmen within the guilds and as burgesses. After the 1450 revolt, an agreement called the Gaffelbrief was established, allowing guild representation in the Council, the highest legislative body in Aachen. However, these changes did not significantly improve the situation for the guilds and the Gaffelbrief was largely ineffective.

=== English cloth ===
The industry's growth up to 1400 went into reverse after the mid-15th century. The English, who previously sold raw wool, began producing clothing for a global market, leading to the decline of the wool trade and the economy of Aachen. The rapid expansion of English manufacturing, as would be expected for a "late-comer", resulted in the production of West-England cloth that surpassed both the quality and cost of cloth made in Europe's most established cities. According to some accounts, in the early 1600s, the Hanseatic League, which held special privileges in this new trade, exported over 150,000 bales of English woolen fabrics to Germany.

=== Calvinism ===
In the 16th and 17th centuries, Aachen faced significant challenges due to religious conflicts throughout Europe. As a predominantly Protestant city, many of its leading clothiers and exporters supported the Reformation. Calvinism, in particular, gained a strong foothold in the city thanks to the support of wealthy clothiers who had fled persecution in other parts of Europe. While Protestants were initially excluded from the Wollenambacht guild, they eventually gained the right to join and were granted the privileges of burgher status. By 1582, the council was dominated by Calvinists, who made up approximately one third of the city's population. This Protestant administration faced opposition from Catholic rulers, including the Spanish governors in the Netherlands who planned an attack on Aachen. The Duke of Julich also imposed a blockade on goods from the city, further damaging its exports which were already struggling in the global market.

==== Thirty Years' War ====
- 17th century and 18th century

The Thirty Years' War had a major influence on the decline of industry in Aachen. The expenses of military occupation and war contributions greatly strained the city's financial resources and disrupted traditional methods of trade, which also hindered the wool industry's access to raw materials. The wool industry's difficulties added to the challenges of selling its fabrics, particularly at the fairs.

The wool industries in Aachen were unable to respond effectively to the competitive forces brought about by the introduction of new English textiles, such as draperies.

The industrial decline was primarily caused by religious conflicts and the detrimental impact of guilds.

By the 18th century, corruption and nepotism had caused the guild system to lose its effectiveness, leading to a decline in craftsmanship. Additionally, the woolen trades were resistant to the emergence of the "putting-out" system, a new industrial model driven by profit-seeking entrepreneurs. This conflict between traditional and capitalist approaches presented a challenge for the guilds. Rather than confronting the guilds directly, early capitalists bypassed them by locating some of their businesses outside the city, particularly in the finishing trades. Raw cloth was increasingly sent to nearby towns to be dyed, resulting in a more "marketable form" of color application.

The finishing trades were the first to go through this change. More and more, the clothiers started sending raw cloth to nearby towns to be dyed. A report from the time said that the colors were applied better and in a more "marketable form" there than in Aachen.

==== Montjoie fine cloth industry ====
The decline of the cloth industry in Aachen and the events that led to it contributed to the rise of the fine cloth industry in Monschau (French: Montjoie); in fact, it reached its peak level of growth and witnessed strong growth in the post–Seven Years' War period (1780). The protestant clothiers organised the Feine Gesellschaft (Fine kinship), an organisation of fine-cloth manufacturers led by Schiebler, to protect their interests.

Production figures of fine cloth produced in Montjoie mentioned in the Kumpfen grew from 2236 in the year 1773 to 3821 in the year 1779, and 4325 in the year 1783, and so the wealth. It was valued then 1.5 million thalers. Thus, Montjoie production exceeded the entire output of all other textile manufacturing hubs in the Duchies of Jülich and Berg.

Bernard Schiebler, the founder of the Montjoie industry and the lower Rhine region's second wealthiest person with 380,000 thalers, also attributed Montjoie's success in fine cloth to Aachen's strict guild structure.

Georg Forster, the German journalist, documented his Rhineland journey in 1790 and wrote, "proportionately, Burtscheid employs more operatives in the manufacture of cloth than Aachen. The largest factory there belongs to Mr. Loewenich and consists of spacious and well-constructed buildings." Forster also remarked on the quality of the fine cloth and the general prosperity and growth that this unregulated industry had experienced in the past decades.

=== Resurgence of Aachen ===
In the 18th century, Aachen underwent major changes, which were driven by changes in the global economy. Clothiers in the city, seeking to improve their businesses, adopted new dyeing techniques and improved their shearing, finishing, and marketing practices. This led to the decline of the guild system, as clothiers sought to remove barriers to free trade. Alphons Thun posits that societal norms may restrict growth but cannot completely halt it.

Over the course of the 18th century, the region of Aachen became the important woolen cloth region in the German cloth trade. In the second half of the 18th century, the Verviers, Eupen, and Aachen triangle had the largest fine cloth industry in Europe and with the most dynamism.

==== Napoleonic wars ====
- 19th century and 20th century

Revolutionary and Napoleonic Wars affected Germany's woolen industries differently. In French-annexed left-bank Rhine areas, guilds were abolished and manufacturers gained access to the French market. Aachen's woolen industry flourished, and mechanised spinning-mills were built. In 1814, Prussian factory inspector J. G. May recorded an increase in wool and cashmere output in Aachen, Eupen, Verviers, Monschau, and nearby hamlets during the war.

Mechanized mills for spinning carded wool were established during and immediately after the Napoleonic Wars in Cottbus and Guben in the Mark Brandenburg, Grünberg in Lower Silesia, and Aachen in the Rhineland. During this period, shearing machines were also installed in Lennep in 1804 and Aachen in 1818.

===== Industrialization =====
At the beginning of the 19th century, Aachen was the first woolen cloth region to use spinning and carding machines.

The regional industrial system underwent substantial change in the first two decades of the 19th century. Around 1830, clothiers in Aachen, Burtscheid, Düren, and Eupen, who controlled the majority of the region's textile industry, maintained centralized facilities and possessed vertically integrated industries.

In the 1830s, there were some 1,850 mechanical looms in the city, giving work to 6,500 weavers. By 1850, the area of Aachen had taken the lead in Germany in the production of textiles, with 17,800 workers employed.

Aachen was a hub for industrial textile production in 1911, with 103 active cloth factories. The textile industry in the city also played a role in the growth of mechanical engineering, chemical manufacturing, and paint production. However, by 1910 the textile industry was in relative decline, with a marked growth in metal working.

Aachen used to be known for its carded wool fabrics, but since the turn of the 20th century, the city's economy shifted to concentrate on manufacturing high-quality worsted fabrics, both piece-dyed and as unique fine worsted variations.

==== Textile school ====
The "Weaving School Association for the Administrative District of Aachen", known as the "Webschulverein für dem Regierungsbezirk Aachen", was founded in 1882 by cloth industrialists. FH Aachen is a university that was founded in 1971 and focuses on applied sciences.

== See also ==
- Cloth merchant
- Chinchilla (cloth)
- Gig-mill
- Timeline of Aachen
