= Toilinet =

19th-century soft cloth of wool and silk

Toilinet (Tollanette) was a 19th-century combination fabric of wool and silk or cotton. It had a thick and soft construction. Toilinet was made with wool filling (weft) and a silk or cotton warp. Toilinet and Swansdown were often used for waistcoats.

== See also ==
- Beaver cloth, a heavy woolen cloth with a napped surface.
