= Moleskin =

Heavy, strong, napped or sheared cotton fabric with a suede-like finish

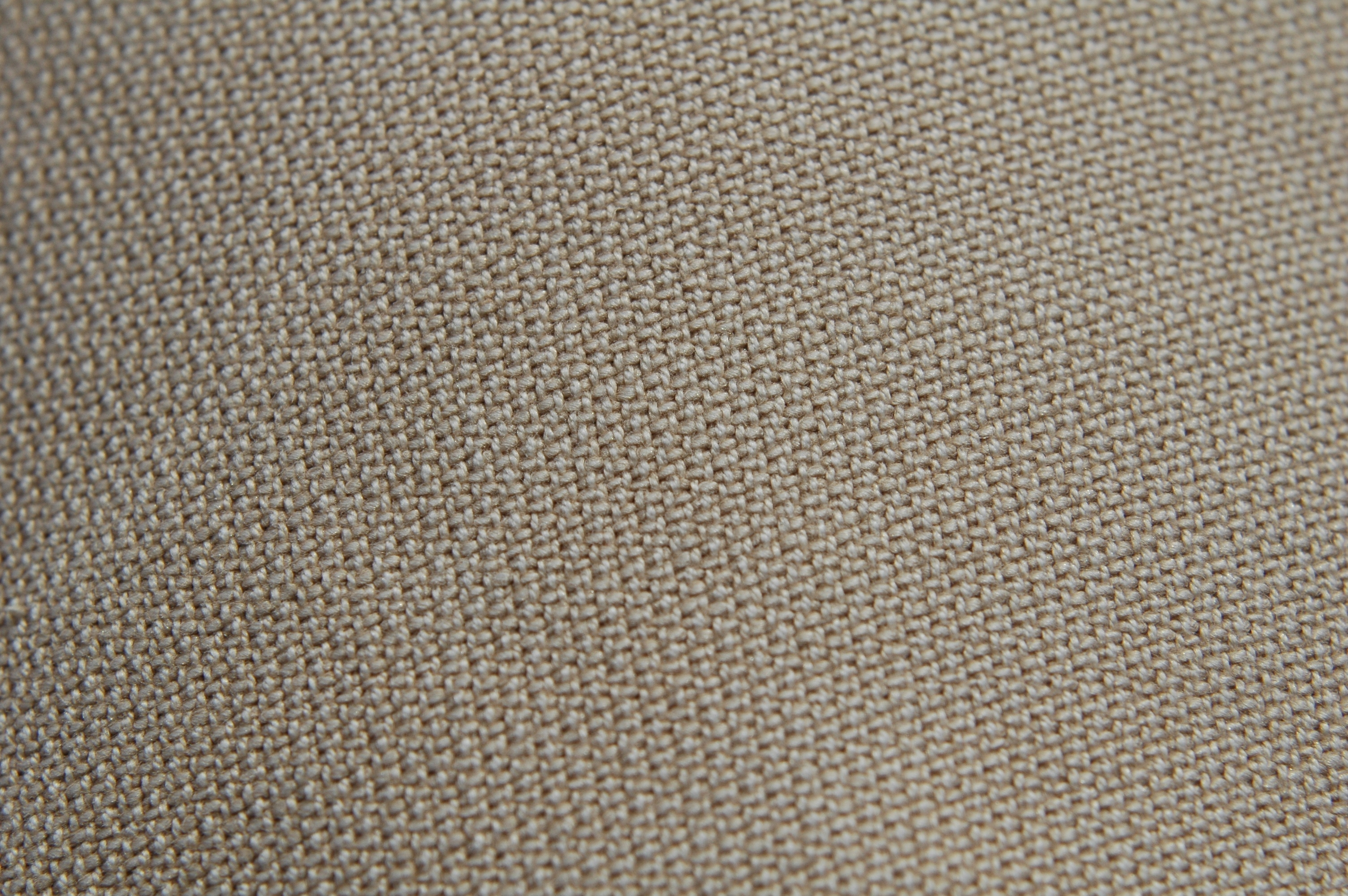
- German moleskin under magnification
- Material type: Heavy cotton fabric

Moleskin is a heavy cotton fabric, woven and then shorn to create a short, soft pile on one side. The feel and appearance of its nap is suede-like, less plush than velour and more like felt or chamois. The word is also used for clothing made from this fabric. Clothing made from moleskin is noted for its softness and durability. Some variants of the cloth are so densely woven as to be windproof.

Its name is derived from the soft brushed hand of the fabric, similar to mole fur. The fur of a mole is also called moleskin.

Moleskin is also a term for soft, dense adhesive pads stuck to the skin to prevent blisters.

== Structure ==
Moleskin is woven of carded cotton yarn in a dense weft-faced satin weave. The surface is napped or shorn to "produce a suede-like finish".

== Uses ==
Moleskin fabric is commonly used to make trousers, also referred to as "moleskins", that are similar to jeans in terms of cut and construction. They similarly started as working menswear, but are now also much more widely worn.

=== Medical ===
Moleskin-like fabric with an adhesive backing is used to prevent or treat blisters, cut with a hole in the centre to provide relief to the affected skin. The thickness of the surrounding moleskin further protects the blister from additional friction.

=== Audiovisual productions ===
Medical moleskin-like fabric with adhesive backing is also commonly used in video and/or audio productions when using a lavalier microphone. When further concealment of a lavalier microphone is needed in these types of productions, it can be worn underneath a layer or layers of the singer's clothing. This would normally cause the microphone to pick up the unwanted noises of the singer's clothing rubbing up against the body and top of the lavalier. Attaching a small strip of moleskin around the microphone body will dramatically reduce the amount of noise created by the singer's clothing and, consequently, reduces the amount of unwanted noise picked up by the lavalier microphone.

=== Military ===
West German army uniforms from the 1960s until the early 1990s were made of "moleskin" fabric in a greyish olive-drab colour, but the German moleskin was not shorn and thus had a flat, smooth outer side. Nonetheless, it was a tough, densely woven material, strongly resistant to wind and abrasion.

Military snipers occasionally wrap the stocks of their rifles in moleskin to absorb sweat and prevent slippage.

=== Workwear ===
Trousers made from moleskin were popular with British workers during the end of the nineteenth century due to the insulating and windproof qualities of the fabric.

== Variations ==
Cotton sateen is a variant of moleskin. It utilises cheaper short-staple cotton to create a softer feeling fabric that is relatively fragile and wears quickly.

== See also ==
- Bedford cord
- Canvas
- Cottonade
- Drill (fabric)
- Herringbone (cloth)
