= Vicuña wool =

Natural animal fiber

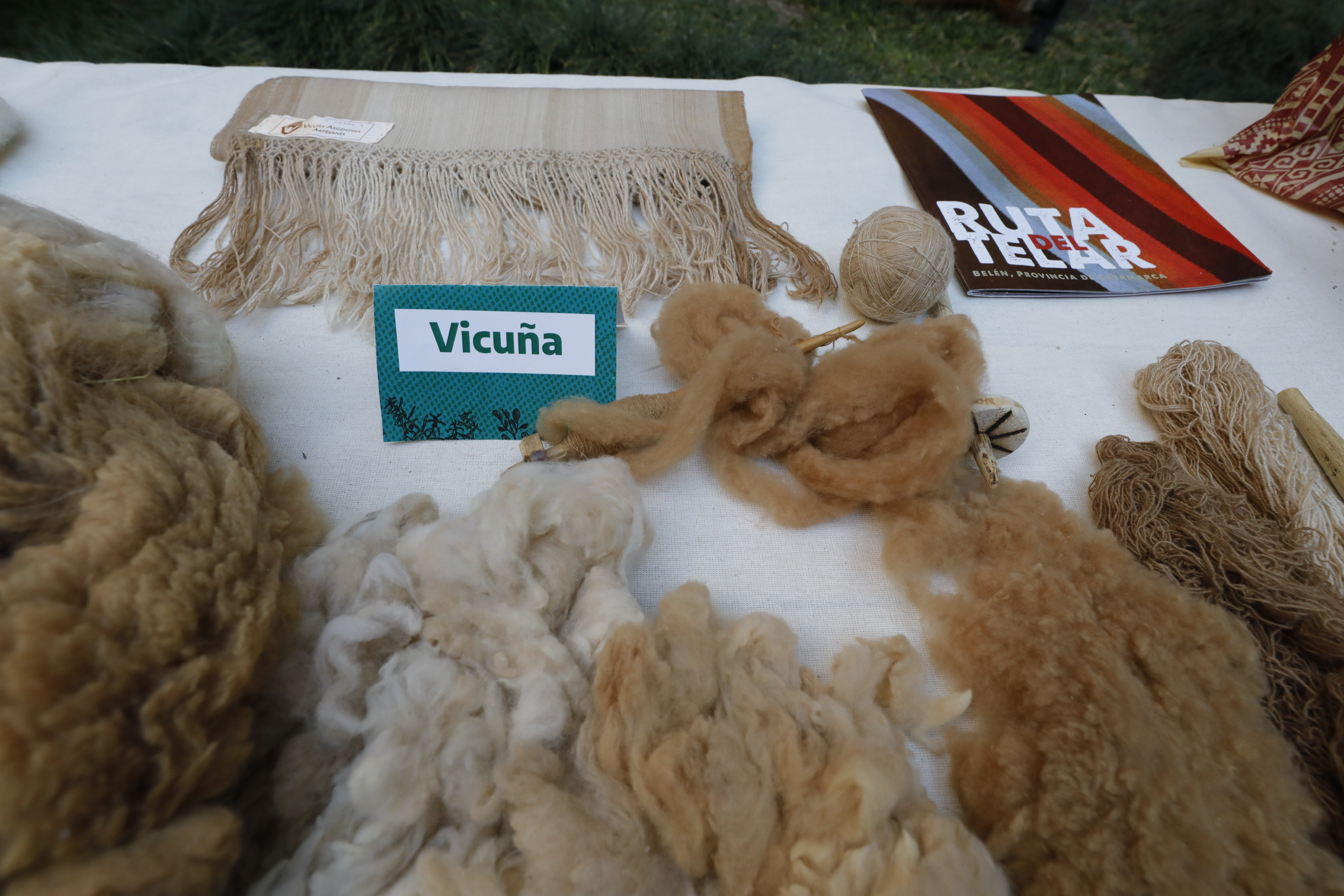
Vicuña wool

Vicuña wool refers to the hair of the South American vicuña, a camelid related to llamas and alpacas. The wool has, after shahtoosh, the second smallest fiber diameter of all animal hair and is the most expensive legal wool.

== Properties ==
The down hair of the vicuña used for the production of vicuña wool is, with an average hair diameter of 11–13.5 microns, one of the finest animal hairs. Only shahtoosh, the hair of the Tibetan antelope, is finer, with an average diameter of 8–13 microns. Among animal textile fibers, besides shahtoosh, only the various silks and byssus have a smaller fiber diameter. The surface structure of the fiber has scales as in sheep wool. The scale spacing is between 7 and 14 scale rings per 100 microns. The cell arrangement of the fiber is bilateral in transmission electron microscopy (as also in guanaco hair), while it is disordered in llama and alpaca. In addition, vicuña wool can also be identified by mass spectrometry.

== Extraction and processing ==
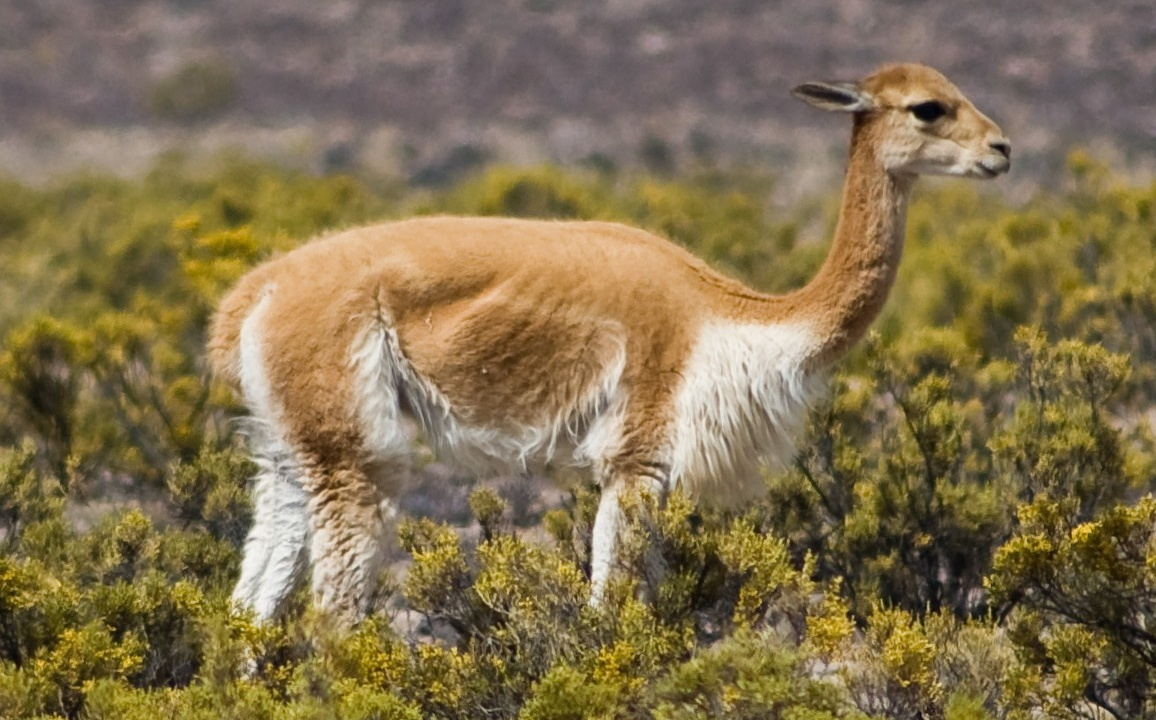
Vicuña

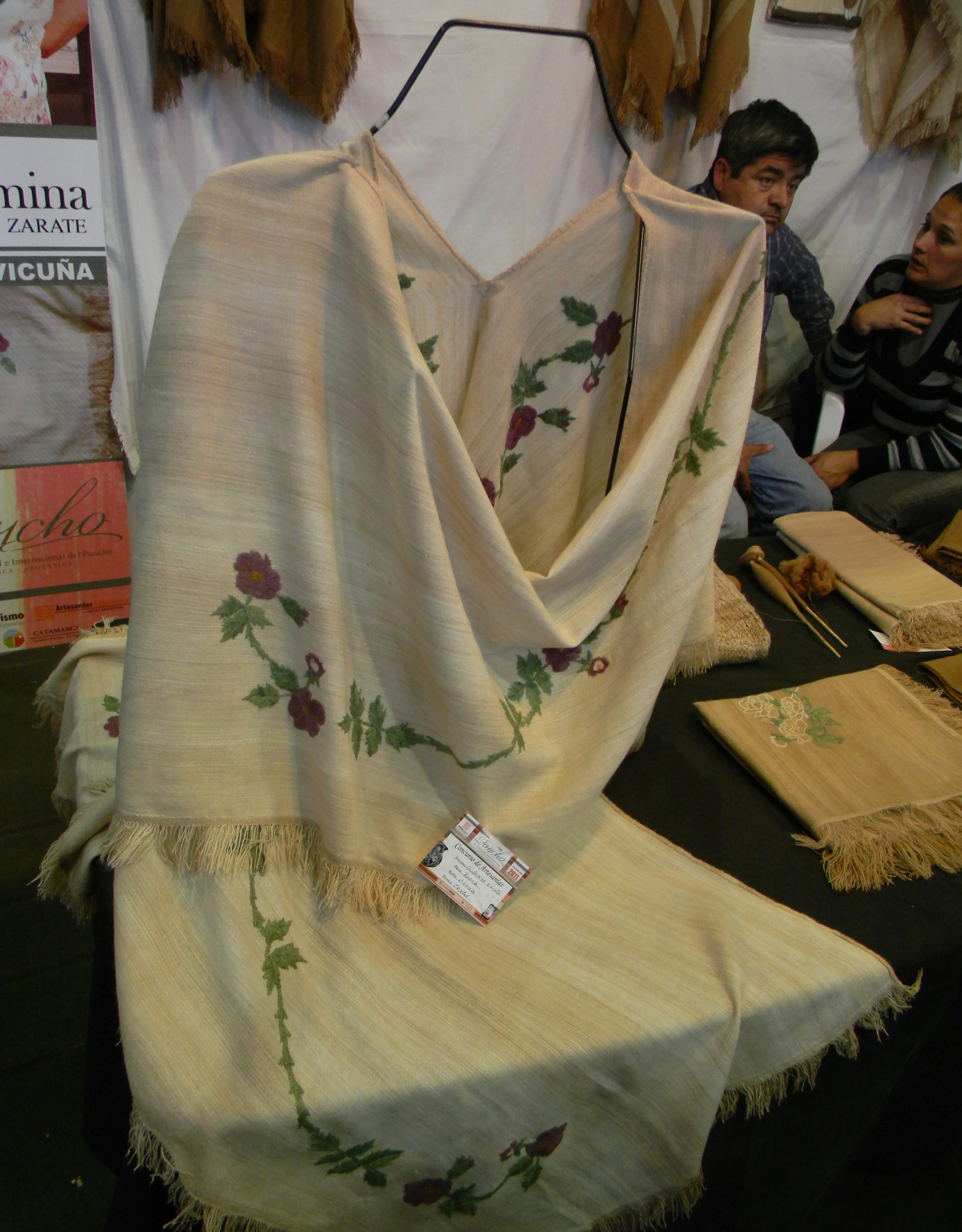
Ruana made of vicuña wool

The Incas herded vicuñas by the tens of thousands into pens, sheared the wool for the exclusive use of high nobles, and then released the animals. In the 20th century, vicuñas were hunted for their fur, so that the population declined to about 8,000 animals and was put under wild life protection. Vicuñas were listed in CITES appendix I until 1994, when conservation efforts had led to a partial restoration of the population and vicuñas were listed in appendix II. Nowadays vicuñas are a protected species. In Peru, Chile, Bolivia and Argentina, they are kept free-ranging in national parks for commercial use, and more rarely in extensive enclosures (especially in Argentina). In Peru, three companies were licensed in 1994 to harvest vicuña wool legally: Loro Piana, Agnona, and Incalpaca TPX. In 2009, 5,500 to 6,000 kilograms of vicuña wool were harvested worldwide. The hair of the vicuña is used to make a variety of products.

The hair of the vicuña is sheared in pens after a traditional roundup ("chaccu"). A wool with an average fiber length of 2–4 cm (0.8–2 in) is obtained every other year. The weight of shorn wool hairs per animal is about 250 g (8.8 oz) every two years to 450 g (16 oz), after removal of unwanted guard hairs from the down hair. Before processing, the down hair is separated from the guard hair by sorting. After sorting the wool, the down hairs are spun into yarn and woven or knitted into textiles. The surface of woven fabrics is often roughened with a raising card to create a softer feel, higher volume and greater thermal insulation. Vicuña wool is considered the rarest and most expensive legal wool in the world; in 2010, raw wool traded for about 7-15 dollars per ounce. The sorted and spun yarn trades at about $300 per ounce. It is usually processed in its natural color, as the structure of vicuña hair suffers from bleaching or dyeing. Northern populations of vicuñas display a more cinnamon-like coat color on the back, southern ones a beige hue; the hair on the belly represents a smaller portion that is much lighter in color. White wool is traded at higher prices. In addition to knitted sweaters and socks, vicuña wool is also used to weave fabrics that are made into exclusive tailored clothing. A sport coat can cost up to $21,000, a made-to-measure suit starts at $32,000.

== Cleaning ==
Like all protein-based fibers (wool, silk), products made from vicuña wool must be cleaned by dry cleaning (water-free) or by hand in tepid water with a mild detergent. Detergents which contain bleach or enzymes (protein-degrading enzymes) are unsuitable, as they damage the hair structure. In the case of hydrophilic textiles, such as textiles made of wool, water contact can lead to thread shortening and thus to shrinkage of the textile due to swelling and the shrinkage that follows during drying. Shrinkage is intensified in clothes dryers. Due to a tendency to felting, textiles made of vicuña wool should not be wrung or rubbed, but can be dabbed.
