= Melanzana (clothing brand) =

American clothing retailer

- Industry: Apparel
- Founded: 1994; 32 years ago
- Founder: Fritz Howard
- Headquarters: Leadville, Colorado
- Products: Outdoor clothing
- Number of employees: 124
- Website: melanzana.com

Melanzana (formerly Eggplant) is an US clothing retailer headquartered in Leadville, Colorado.

== History ==
In 1994, Melanzana was founded by Fritz Howard as an outdoor clothing company named Eggplant. Following a trademark dispute, the company was renamed Melanzana, the Italian word for eggplant.

In 1997, Melanzana opened its first retail storefront in Leadville, Colorado. In 2008, the company relocated its operations to Leadville's Harrison Avenue. In 2021, Melanzana expanded its manufacturing operations to a second location on Harrison Avenue. In 2024, it opened another manufacturing facility in Alamosa, Colorado.

== Operations ==
=== Manufacturing ===
Melanzana products are cut and sewn by hand using Polartec polar fleece.

=== Retail ===
Melanzana sells its products through its physical store, and its online store. The company operates both an open retail area, where a selection of products are available to the general public, and an appointment-only store that provides access to its full product line.

During the COVID-19 pandemic, Melanzana briefly introduced the Lock Out Lottery (LOL), a system through which customers could enter for a chance to receive a shopping code for its temporary online store. The brand's limited availability and retail model have contributed to a devoted following among outdoor recreation enthusiasts.

=== Philanthropy ===
Melanzana donates a portion of its profits to 15 local non-profits through its PB & Melly program.

== See also ==
- Gorpcore
