= Polartec Alpha Direct =

Lightweight Polartec-branded active insulation material

- Type: Fabric
- Material: Polyester
- Production method: Knitting
- Introduced: c. 2017
- Manufacturer: Polartec

Polartec Alpha Direct is a type of synthetic active insulation fabric developed by Polartec. It is a direct successor to the original Polartec Alpha fabric, distinguished by its ability to be manufactured into garments without an inner lining fabric, allowing it to be worn directly against the skin.

== History ==
Polartec Alpha Direct is an evolution of the original Polartec Alpha insulation, which was developed in collaboration with the U.S. Special Operations Forces around 2012. The military requirement was for a highly breathable, quick-drying, and packable insulation material for demanding, variable-intensity activities in cold environments.

The key innovation of Alpha Direct, introduced approximately five years after the original Alpha, was to engineer the insulating fibers and the backing knit structure so that a separate lightweight lining fabric was no longer necessary. This eliminated weight, increased overall breathability, and allowed the distinctive textured face of the insulation to be visible, leading to its adoption by outdoor and lifestyle brands.

== Structure and properties ==
Polartec Alpha Direct is a knit fabric composed of 100% polyester. Its structure features a base mesh grid with lofted synthetic fibers engineered to connect directly to this grid. This open construction is central to its function.

The fabric is designed for active thermal management, providing warmth at rest while allowing excess heat and moisture vapor to escape during high-exertion activities. It is characterized by a high warmth-to-weight ratio, extremely fast drying times, and high breathability. A notable trade off for its breathability is that it provides minimal inherent wind resistance and is typically paired with a windproof or waterproof shell in windy conditions.

The material is produced in various weights, commonly expressed in grams per square meter (GSM). Typical weights include 60, 90, 120, and 200 GSM, allowing for garments suited to different temperature ranges and activity levels.

== Applications ==
Alpha Direct is used in lightweight, performance-focused garments for outdoor activities such as hiking, trail running, ski touring, and mountaineering. Items of clothing include: jackets, hoodies, vests, beanies, pants, socks and gloves.

Major outdoor brands such as Marmot, Rab, Norrøna, and Patagonia have incorporated Alpha Direct into their product lines. It is also widely used by smaller, specialized "cottage industry" manufacturers.

== See also ==
- Polartec
- Polar fleece
