= Raising card =

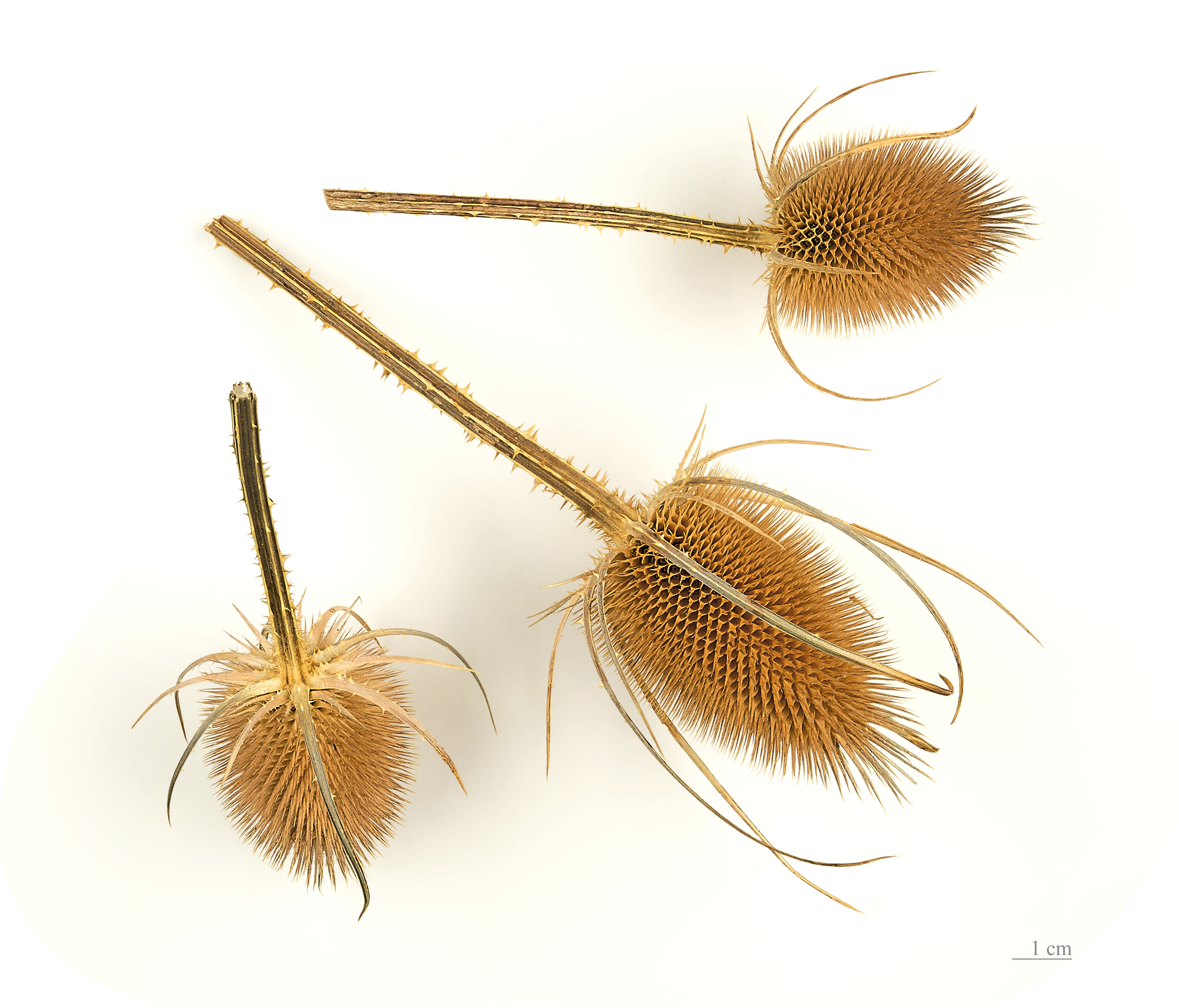
Dried teasel fruit pods

A raising card is used in the process of gigging, or producing the nap of cloth. Originally, only woolen cloth was raised, but now gigging is used on rayon, silk, and cotton fabrics to create a soft, lustrous nap.

Raising is one of the last steps in the finishing process for cloth. It was first done using the dried fruit pod of a teasel plant, then technology moved on and raising cards were created. A raising card is a brush with metal bristles, similar to hand cards and to the original teasel pod.

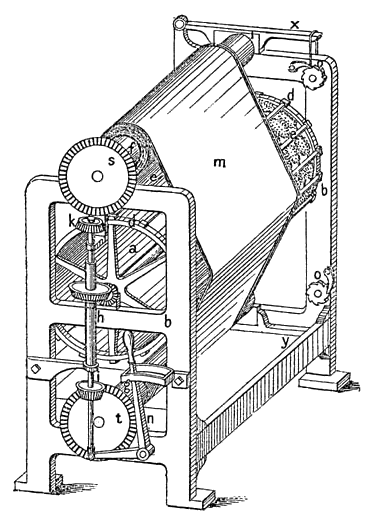
A gigging machine

The process was mechanized during the industrial revolution, and the raising machine (the gig-mill) looks and works much like the large carding machines, in that it has a large main roller with several small ones positioned around it. The small ones rotate quickly, in either the same direction or opposite to that of the cloth.

After the raising process, the nap is uneven. In order to gain an even surface, the nap is then sheared, or cut, to the desired height.
