= Malden Mills =

American textile manufacturer

Malden Mills Industries
- Industry: Manufacturing
- Founded: 1906
- Founder: Henry Feuerstein
- Headquarters: Lawrence, Massachusetts
- Area served: Massachusetts; New Hampshire
- Products: Polar Fleece; Textiles

Malden Mills Industries is the original developer and manufacturer of Polartec polar fleece and manufactures other modern textiles. The company is located in Andover, Massachusetts and has operations in Hudson, New Hampshire.

== History ==
Malden Mills was founded in 1906 by Henry Feuerstein and operated for three generations under the Feuerstein Family. Malden Mills started off with specialization in lightweight fabrics and wool clothing.

== Fire and rebuilding ==
On December 11, 1995, a dust explosion in one of the hoppers used to produce Polartec destroyed three of the factory's buildings, causing 40% damage to the whole plant. The fire happened during the company’s off season, leading to minimized losses, though at the time it was the largest property damage fire loss in the history of Massachusetts. Initially thought to have started in a boiler, subsequent investigation found it was likely started in a hopper on the "flock" line, where nylon fibers are oriented in a 50,000 volt electric field while applied to adhesive on a backing fabric. Fibers occasionally ignited passing through this field, and despite automatic fire suppression methods, a previous explosion occurred in 1993 seriously burning several workers.

Lawrence, Massachusetts was already experiencing a downward economy due to many other companies leaving to find cheaper labor elsewhere, and many residents were worried about the loss of another factory. The fire injured 36 people and placed 2700 jobs at risk. The fire was later ruled an "industrial accident".

CEO Aaron Feuerstein made the decision overnight to quickly rebuild. He extended the pay and benefits of his employees while the factory was being rebuilt. Rebuilding was completed on September 14, 1997, leaving 70 employees still displaced. Though ultimately Feuerstein's choices may have led to the insolvency of the company and the loss of nearly all of the jobs that Feuerstein was trying to preserve, he received praise for his choice to de-prioritize the profitability of his company.

== Bankruptcy ==
In November 2001, Malden Mills declared bankruptcy after the recession at the beginning of the new year left the company unable to pay creditors—related to its rebuilding and payroll commitments. The company achieved solvency because of the generosity of its creditors, as well as government subsidies. Feuerstein was relieved of actual control of the company by its creditors.

In January 2007, current CEO Michael Spillane announced that Malden Mills would file for bankruptcy again and would be sold to the Gordon Brothers Group of Boston.

However, in February 2007, the assets of Malden Mills were purchased by a newly formed company called Polartec, LLC which is owned by Chrysalis Capital Partners of Philadelphia, Pennsylvania.

A notice on the old www.MaldenMillsStore.com said the week of July 23, 2007 would be the final shipping period for rolls of fabric from the company. The notice also said an employee group was starting a new fabric-making enterprise to be announced.

On June 28, 2007, the federal Pension Benefit Guaranty Corporation said it would take over the underfunded (by 49%) Malden Mills pension plan, which covers about 1500 employees. PBGC said the sale of Malden Mills assets meant that the pension plan would be abandoned because the company missed a $1.7 million pension payment.

== Polartec, LLC ==
In 2007 Malden Mills filed its final bankruptcy and Versa Capital purchased the assets to create a new company, Polartec, LLC.

Polartec offers over 400 different fabrics including:

- Polartec Power Dry
- Polartec Power Stretch, Power Stretch Pro
- Polartec Classic Micro, 100, 200, 300
- Polartec Thermal Pro
- Polartec Alpha
- Polartec Alpha Direct (60, 90, 120, 200)
- Polartec Wind Pro
- Polartec Windbloc
- Polartec Power Shield
- Polartec Power Shield 02
- Polartec Power Shield Pro
- Polartec Power Shield Stretch Wovens
- Polartec Power Wool
- Polartec NeoShell
- Flame Resistant Fabrics and Layering Systems

Polartec's customers include all branches of the United States Military, Patagonia, The North Face, Marmot, Mountain Equipment Co-op, Mountain Hardwear, Cabela's, Lands' End, L.L.Bean, Jack Wolfskin, Lafuma, Eider, Millet, Rab, Outdoor Research, Quiksilver, Melanzana, and many other technical apparel brands around the globe.

In 2011, Polartec launched a waterproof breathable fabric called Polartec NeoShell. This is a new category for Polartec – competing directly against Gore-Tex and other waterproof breathable fabrics. Polartec NeoShell's differentiating feature is a high level of air permeability.

In December 2015, the company announced that it would close manufacturing operations in Lawrence, Massachusetts, and move production to plants in Hudson, New Hampshire and Tennessee.
