= Cottonade =

Coarse and heavy cotton cloth

Cottonade was a coarse and heavy cotton cloth, usually yarn dyed. Multiple formations were available, including plain, twill, and serge. It was a kind of woolen imitation, and the strong variants were used for men's trousers. Twill structured blue-and-white striped men's workwear with hickory cloth-like appearance was used. Cottonade was initially used for less-expensive men's clothing, it was eventually supplanted by superior materials such as "cassimeres" (kerseymere), which became fashionable.

== Hickory shirting ==
Hickory shirting was a similar cloth made with dyed yarn stripes in twill structure. When cottonade was used for trousers, hickory was used for shirts.

== See also ==
- Gabardine
