= Swansdown =

19th-century soft cloth of wool and silk

Swansdown was a fancy woolen material of the 19th century. It was a soft mix of wool and silk used for waistcoats. Wool was the primary fiber, blended with silk, and later with cotton. Waistcoats made of toilinet and swansdown were popular with equestrians.

== See also ==
- Beaver cloth, a heavy woolen cloth with a napped surface.
