= Shearing (textiles) =

Kind of mechanical finish

Shearing is a kind of mechanical finish in which the appearance of the fabric is enhanced by cutting the loops or raised surface to a uniform and even height. The machine may have a spiral blade similar to a reel lawn mower. A shearing machine can cut the loop or the pile to a desired level. Shearing was most commonly used to make woollens and worsted materials. It was a part of dry finishing of woollen and worsted goods. Previously, shearing was also a component of gigging or napping; when partially produced goods were exposed to shear in order to improve the impact of gigging or napping, the process was referred to as "cropping".

== History ==
Most of the Medieval clothing and textiles were processed and finished manually. The finishing of English Woollens includes shearing. Shearmen were skilled artisans who used to shear the fabric by hand. Shearman's job was to nap the cloth manually, using teasels and shears to trim the pile. A silky and smooth feeling was produced by the gradual lowering of the nap. The process was referred to as "dry shearing". It was formerly an expensive and lengthy process compared to the "wet shearing" that was a rough process. During the early 17th century, two shearmen spent two weeks dry shearing three broadcloths.

== Shearing machine ==
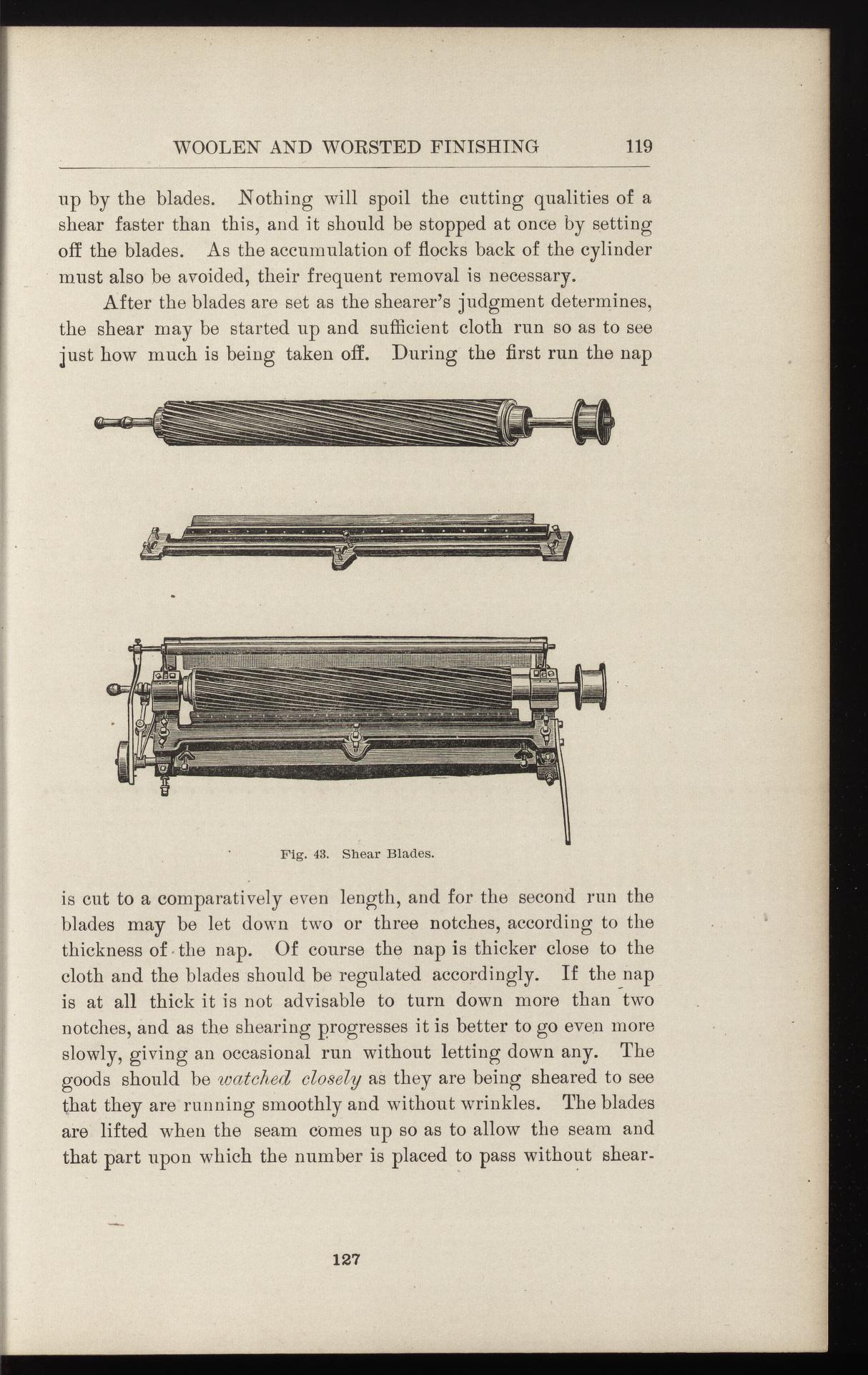
Shearing machine blades

A shearing machine is a machine equipped with shearing cylinder, ledger blade, fluff exhaust, and joint seam sensors. The machine operates similarly to a lawn mower. Seam joint sensors prevent seams from being cut.

== Advantages ==
Moleskin and velvet are shorn materials in which pile is cut to a certain level. Other than imparting an aesthetic finish, shearing was also used to cut certain deformations, unwanted surface defects such as protruding yarns. In the case of polyester blends, a shearing machine is also useful for removing surface beads or naps of dyed fibers.

=== Sculptured effect ===
Shearing can also create certain effects, sculpted effects are achieved by flattening sections of the pile with an engraved roller and then the remaining upright sections are shorn off. Flattened portions are then steamed and raised.

Embossed velvet and plush fabric are created by weaving the pile high and shearing it to various levels, or by pressing a portion of the pile flat.

== See also ==
- Pile (textile)
