= Serge (fabric) =

Type of twill fabric

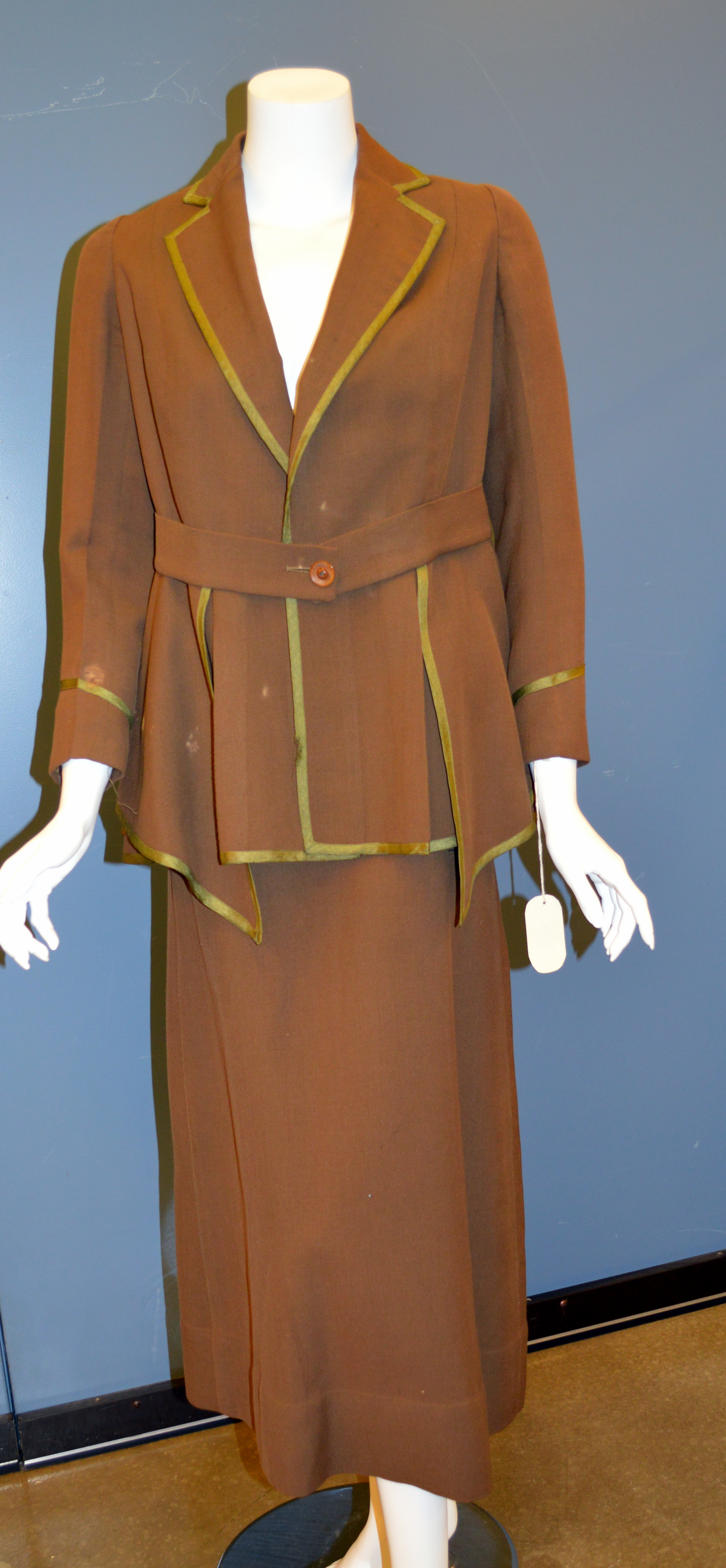
A serge suit

Serge is a type of twill fabric that has diagonal lines or ridges on both inner and outer surfaces via a two-up, two-down weave. The worsted variety is used in making military uniforms, suits, greatcoats, and trench coats. Its counterpart, silk serge, is used for linings. French serge is a softer, finer variety. The word is also used for a high-quality woven woolen fabric.

== Etymology ==
The name is derived from Old French serge, itself from Latin serica, from Greek σηρικός (sērikós), meaning 'silken'.

== History ==
The early association of silk serge with Greece and France was made evident by the discovery in Charlemagne's tomb of a piece of silk serge dyed with Byzantine motifs, evidently a gift from the Byzantine Imperial Court in the 8th or 9th century AD.

It also appears to refer to a form of silk twill produced in the early renaissance in or around Florence, used for clerical cassocks. A reference can be found in Don Quixote:

I am more pleased to have found it than anyone had given me a Cassock of the best Florentine serge

— The Curate, in Miguel de Cervantes, Don Quixote, Book I, Chapter VI

From early Saxon times, most English wool ("staples") was exported. In the early 16th century, serge became a Royal monopoly in Calais (then an English possession), and was woven into cloth in France or the Low Countries. However, with the French taking possession of the town during the Siege of Calais on 7 January 1558, England began expanding its own weaving industry. This was greatly enhanced by the European Wars of Religion (Eighty Years' War, French Wars of Religion); in 1567, Calvinist refugees from the Low Countries included many skilled serge weavers, while Huguenot refugees in the early 18th century included many silk and linen weavers.

Wool worsted serges are known of from the 12th century, onward. Modern serges are made with worsted warp and a woollen weft.

Denim is a cotton fabric with a similar weave; its name is believed to be derived from serge de Nîmes after Nîmes in France.

== Say ==
Say or Saye was a lighter serge variety. It was thin woolen stuff of twilled structure.

== See also ==
- Falding
- Perpetuana
- Red Serge
- Tweed
