= Nap (fabric) =

Raised fibers on the surface of a textile

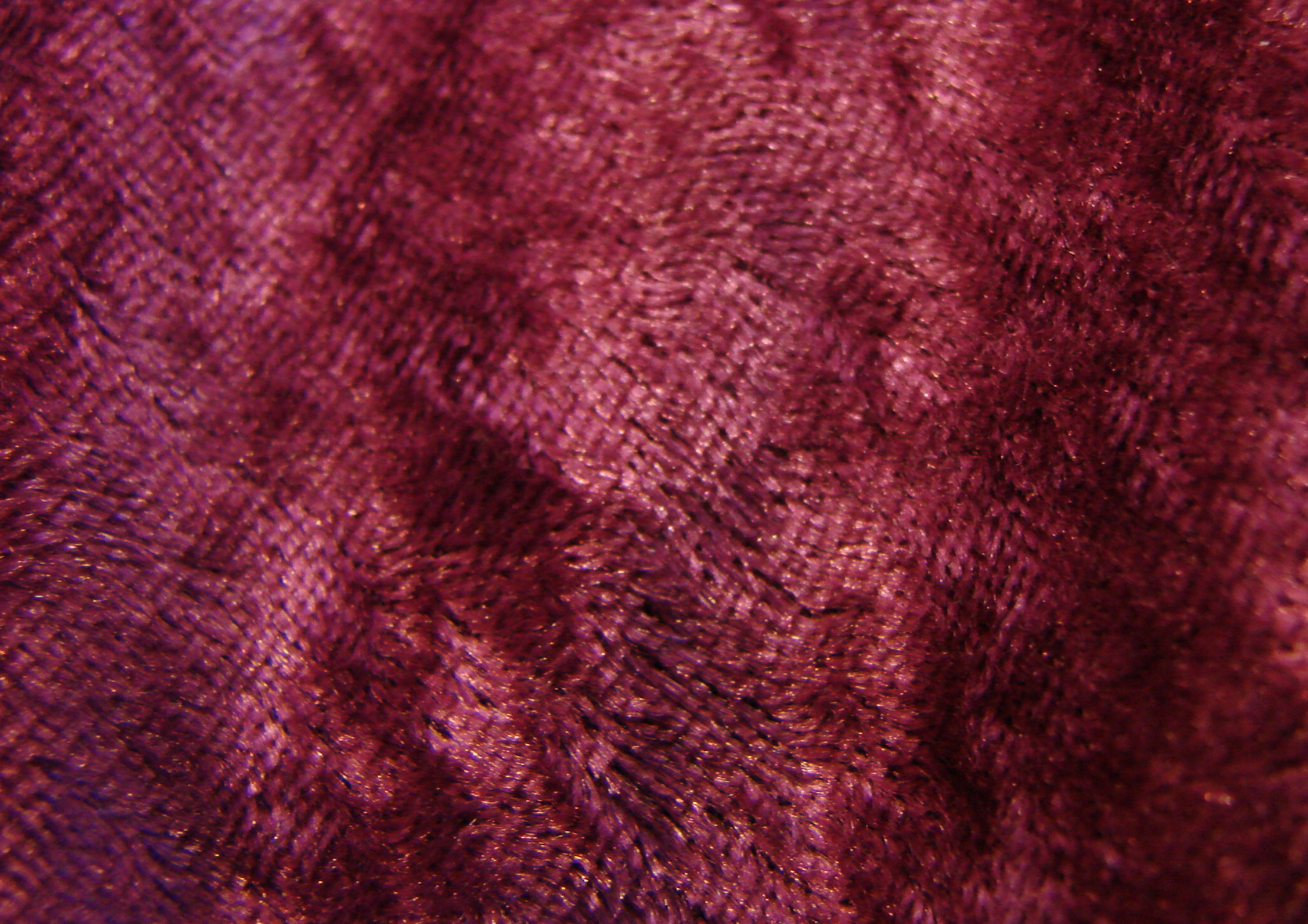
A cloth with a nap

Primarily, nap is the raised (fuzzy) surface on certain kinds of cloth, such as velvet or moleskin. Nap can refer additionally to other surfaces that look like the surface of a napped cloth, such as the surface of a felt or beaver hat.

Starting around the 14th century, the word referred originally to the roughness of woven cloth before it was sheared. When cloth, especially woollen cloth, is woven, the surface of the cloth is not smooth, and this roughness is the nap. Generally the cloth is then "sheared" to create an even surface, and the nap is thus removed. A person who trimmed the surface of cloth with shears to remove any excess nap was known as a shearman.

Nap typically has a direction in which it feels smoothest. In garments, nap direction is often matched across seams, because cloth will not only feel but look different depending on the direction of the nap. For this reason, sewing patterns frequently show the nap direction, or warn that more fabric will be needed if the fabric has a nap.

== Piled nap ==
Since the 15th century, the term nap has generally referred to a special pile given to the cloth. The term pile refers to raised fibres that are there on purpose, rather than as a by-product of producing the cloth. In this case, the nap is woven into the cloth, often by weaving loops into the fabric, which can then be cut or left intact. Carpets, rugs, velvet, velour, and velveteen, are made by interlacing a secondary yarn through woven cloth, creating a nap or pile.

== Raising the nap ==
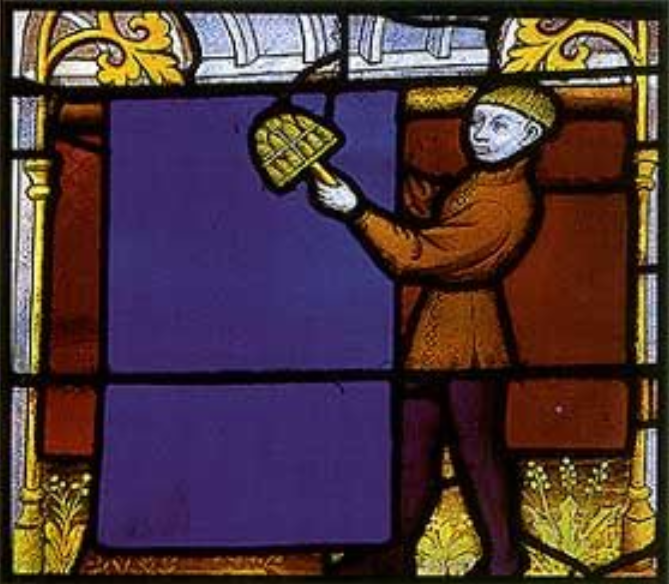
Cloth worker using a teasel frame to raise the nap on a piece of cloth, 15th century stained-glass window, Notre Dame de Semur-en-Auxois, France.

In the finishing process of manufacturing textiles, after the cloth is woven, it goes through processes such as washing, fulling, raising the nap and trimming the nap. After the nap is trimmed, the fabric is considered finished. The raising process, which draws out the ends of the fibres, is done on both woollen and cotton fabric. Flannelette is a cotton fabric that goes through this process. There are ways to 'raise the nap', most of which involve wire brushes such as raising cards. Originally, dried teasel pods were used and were still preferred for use on woollen cloth for a long time. Woollen fabrics, which must be damp when raising the nap, are then dried and stretched before the nap is trimmed or sheared. Cotton cloth goes straight to the shearing process, where the nap gets trimmed to ensure that all the raised fibres are the same length.

== Sueding and emerizing ==
Fabric sueding is carried out on a sueding machine with abrasive covered rollers; the machines can suede both sides of fabric, whether woven or knitted. Creasing and variations in the center selvedge are two major concerns with sueded fabrics. Fabrics that have been sueded or emerized are known as 'sueded fabrics' or 'emerized fabrics.'

=== Sueding ===
Sueding is a mechanical finishing process that exposes the material to an abrasive surface, creating a small, soft pile. The abrasion mechanism may be equipped with sandpaper, emery paper or carbon brushes.

==== Sueding action ====
The abrasive material on the machine's rollers cuts and shreds surface fibres, resulting in a soft texture with a short pile.

===== Trademarked sueded fabrics =====
Alcantara, Ultrasuede and Microsuede are a few of the many trademarked brand names for types of plush microfiber with a feel resembling soft suede; this type of material is more durable and resistant to liquids and stains, and can be used in upholstery, accessories, clothing or shoes.

== See also ==
- Beaver (cloth)
- Gig-mill
- Falding
