= Aachen thermal springs =

Thermal springs in Germany

- Aachener Thermalquellen; Thermal Springs of Aachen and Burtscheid
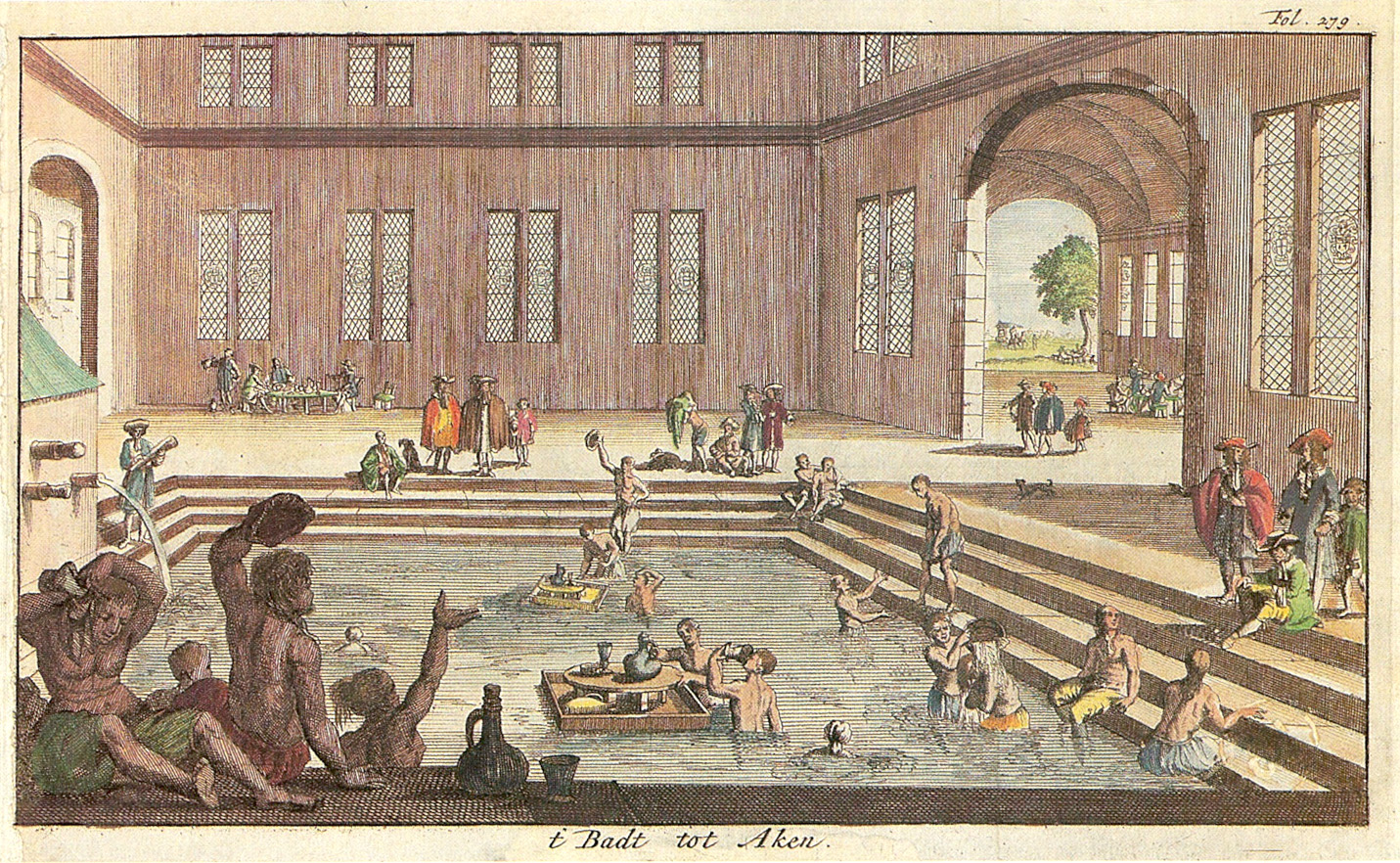
- Aachen Kaiserbad, 1682
- Interactive map of Aachen thermal springs
- Location: Aachen and Burtscheid, Germany
- Coordinates: 50°46′32″N 06°05′01″E
- Elevation: 173 ft (53 m)
- Type: geothermal
- Discharge: Aachen springs: 3.5 million liters per day Burtscheid springs: 2.2 million liters per day
- Temperature: 158°F / 70°C

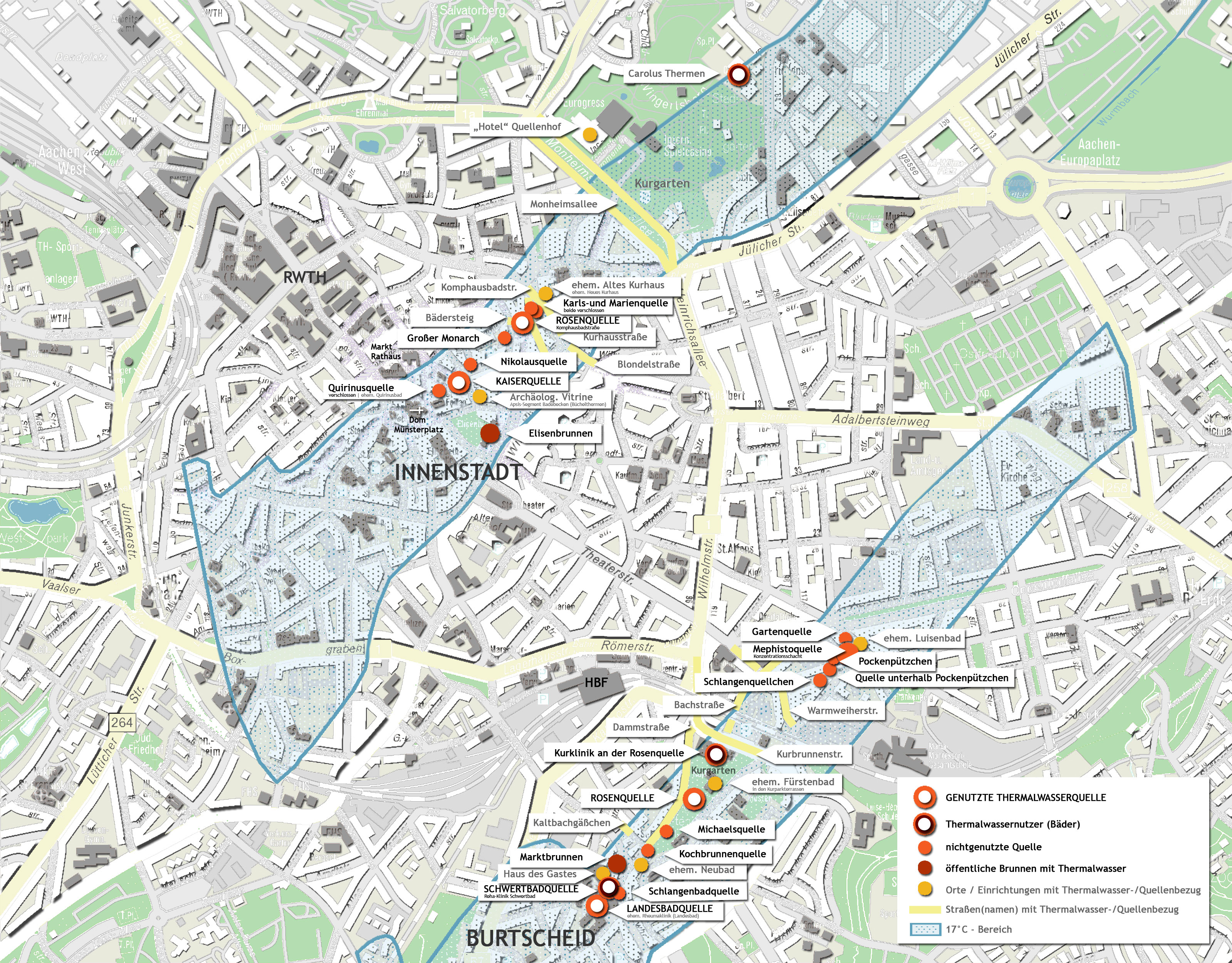
Thermal springs in the Aachen area

The Aachener Thermalquellen, also known as the Thermal Springs of Aachen and Burtscheid, are a system of more than 30 thermal mineral springs located in the area around Aachen (Aix-la-Chapelle), Germany. The area has been known for its hot sulfur springs for thousands of years.

The hot mineral water aquifer flows from the Upper Devonian limestones that meet the Variscan thrust front of the Rhenish Massif, and flow through the city center of Aachen in a 500m long by 50m (maximum width) area, emerging from the source at numerous spring heads. Four of these spring heads are still accessible; two are managed. The hot spring flow from Burtscheid (a district of Aachen) is 2200m long with numerous spring heads.

The hot springs have been used for balneotheraputic purposes since the early Roman settlement in Aachen. The historical political and economic growth of Aachen developed around the springs, in particular mineral water production, the spa and bathing sector, and the textile industry. Later the Franks arrived. The first known written text about Bad Aachen (Aachen baths) is linked to the Frankish king, Pippin the Short. Charlemagne inherited Pippin's manor at Bad Aachen sometime after 766 AD.

Aachen came to be known as an elegant European spa town where personages such as George Frideric Handel, Albrecht Dürer, Voltaire, and Peter the Great "took the waters” at Bad Aachen.

== History ==
The thermal springs in the Aachen area have been known for thousands of years. Stone tools as old as 6,500 years have been found nearby. Burial mounds in the area are dated from the Bronze and Iron Ages. Around 600 BC, the Celts arrived; later in the 1st century AD, the Romans established a large spa for the military at Aachen. These baths could hold 6,000 soldiers at a time.

== Water profile ==
The thermal springs of the Aachen/Burtscheid area are situated within Upper Devonian limestone. The hot mineral water emerges from the source at an average of 158°F / 70°C, and is high in sodium, chloride, and sulfate. The city of Aachen has stated that the spring water contains "not less than 19 different mineral elements." The discharge flow from the Aachen springs is 3.5 million liters per day, making them the most productive thermal springs in Germany. The springs at Burtsheid discharge 2.2 million liters per day.

== Gallery ==
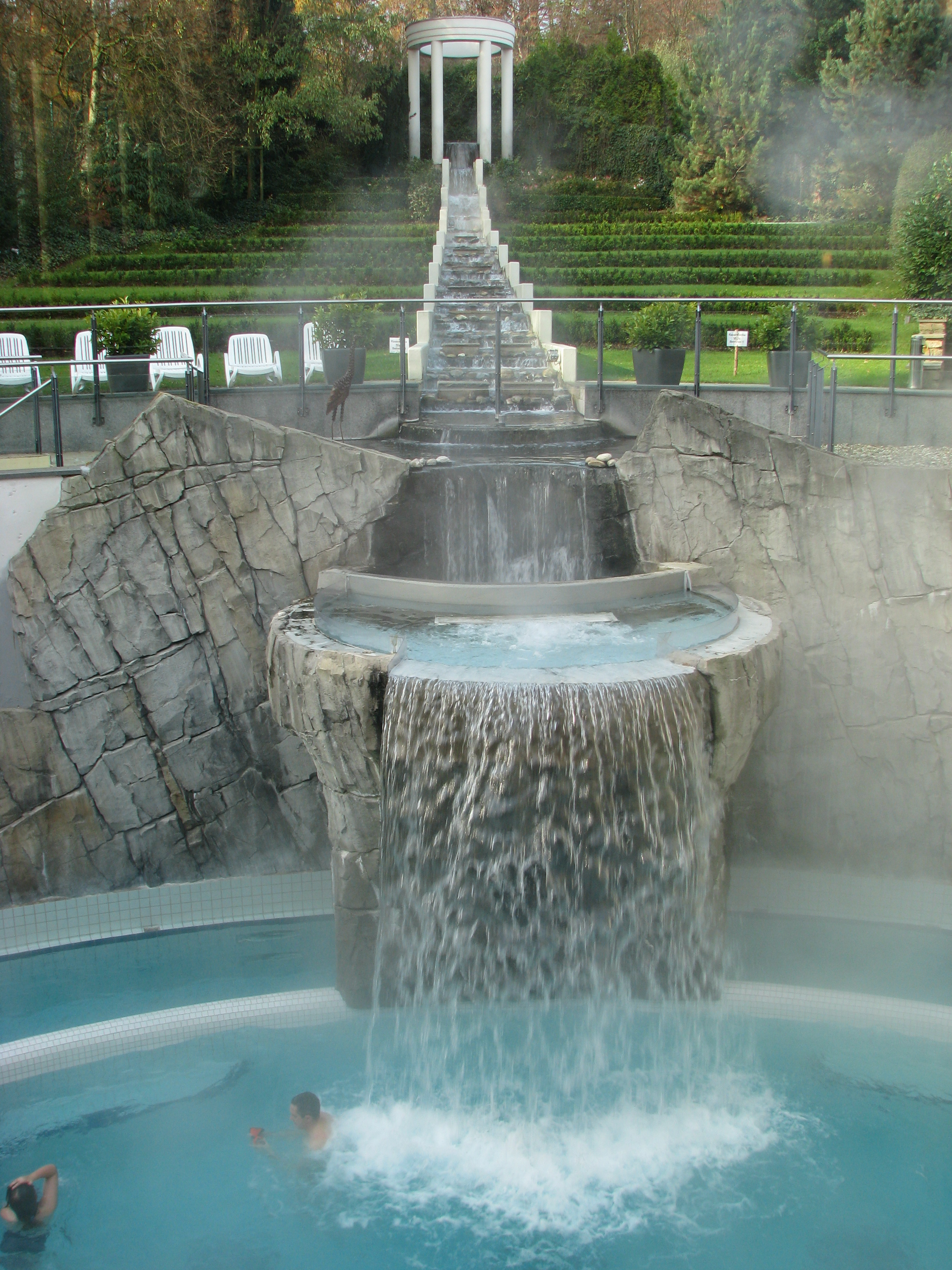
Carolus Thermen hot waterfall and soaking pool

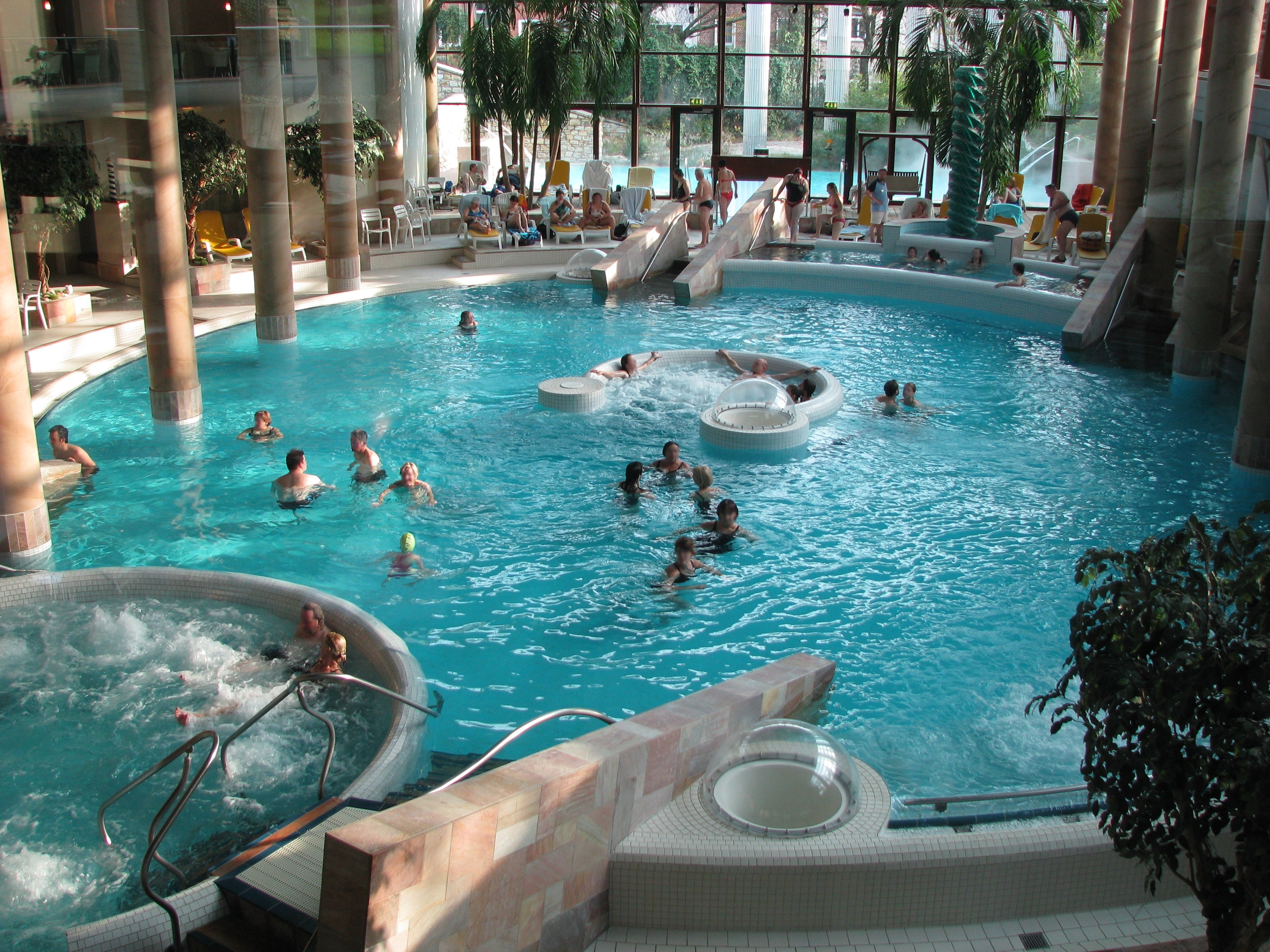
Carolus Thermen

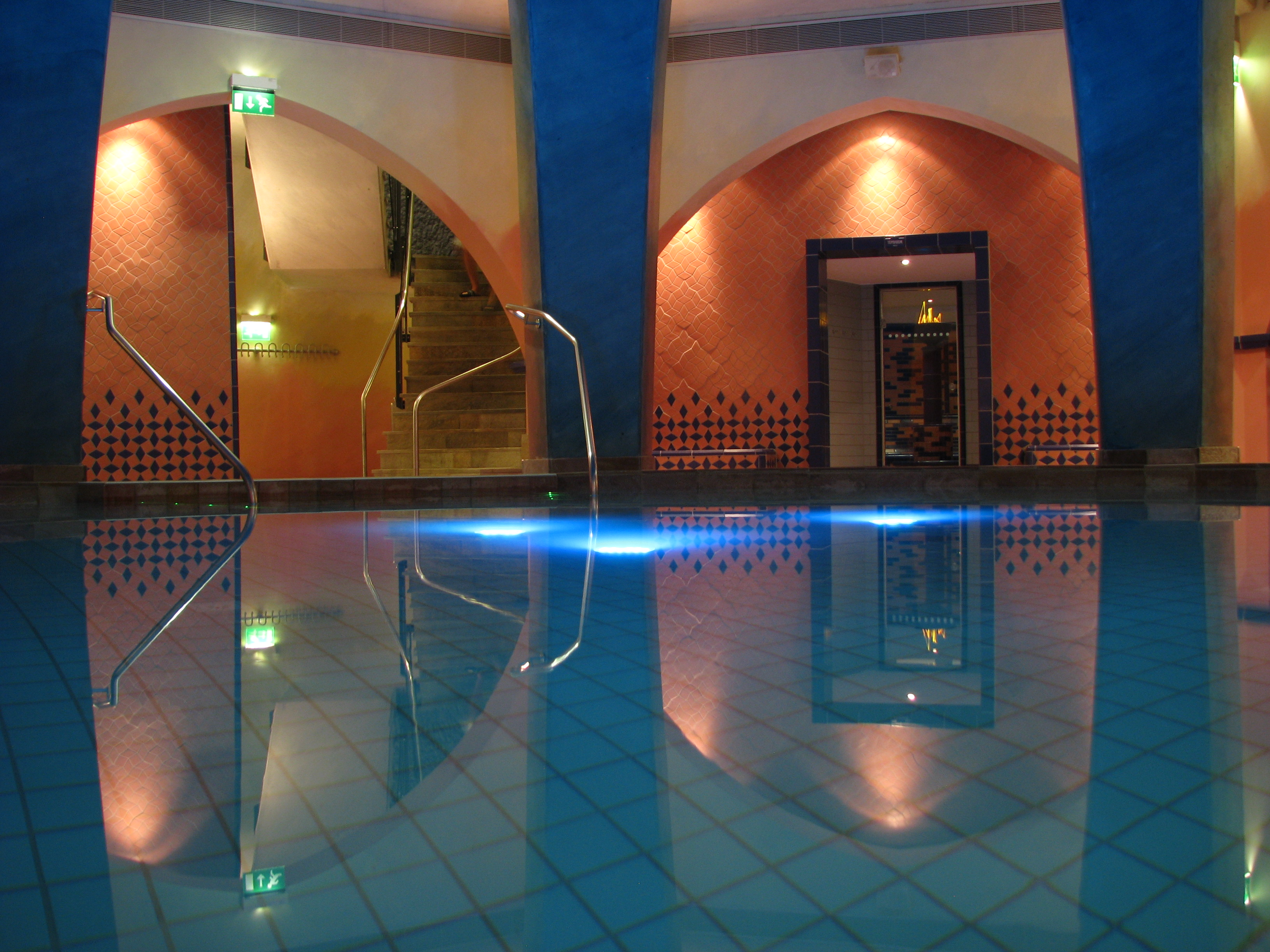
Carolus Thermen Ruhepool Tepardarium

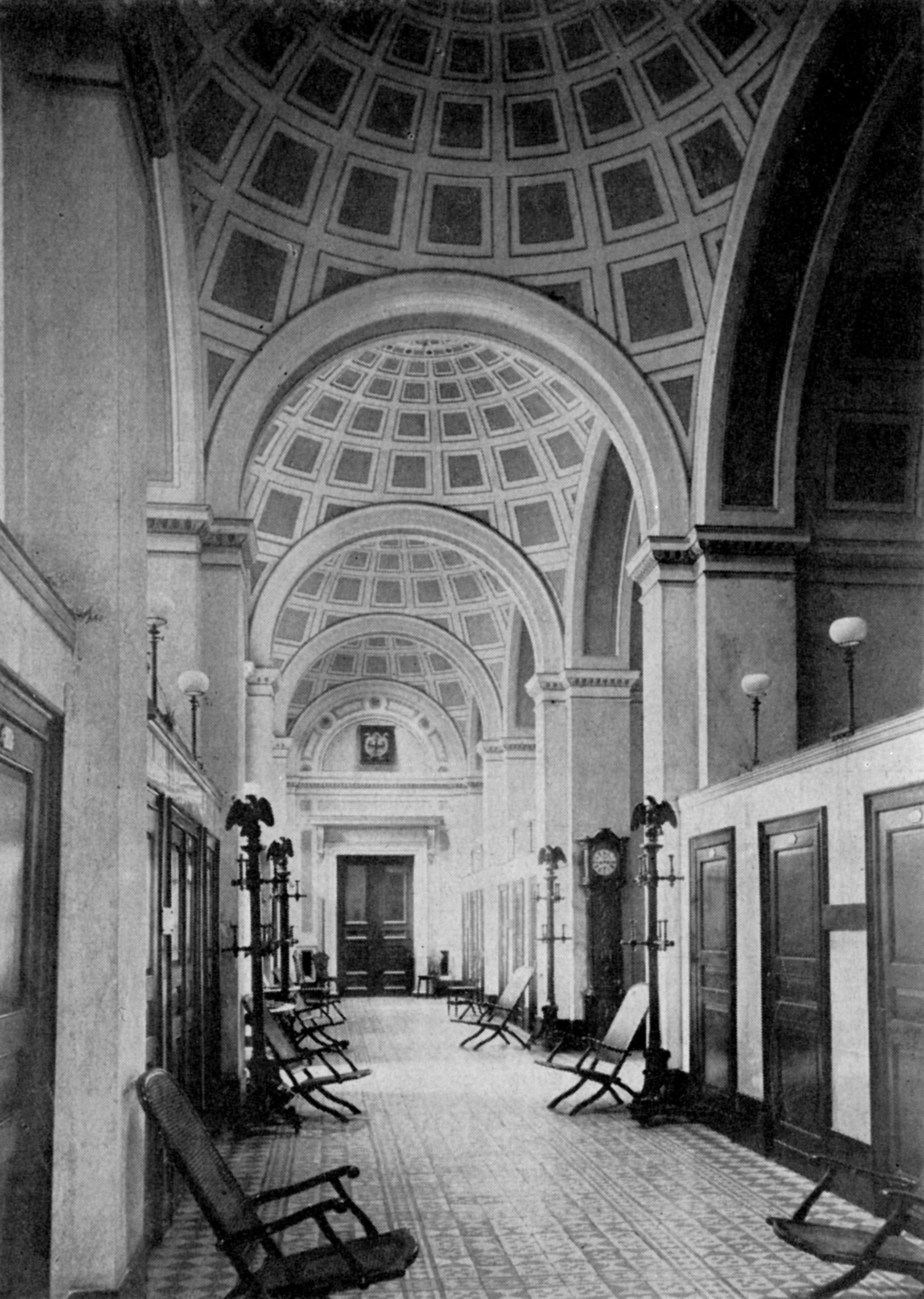
Badehalle Kaiserbad 1900

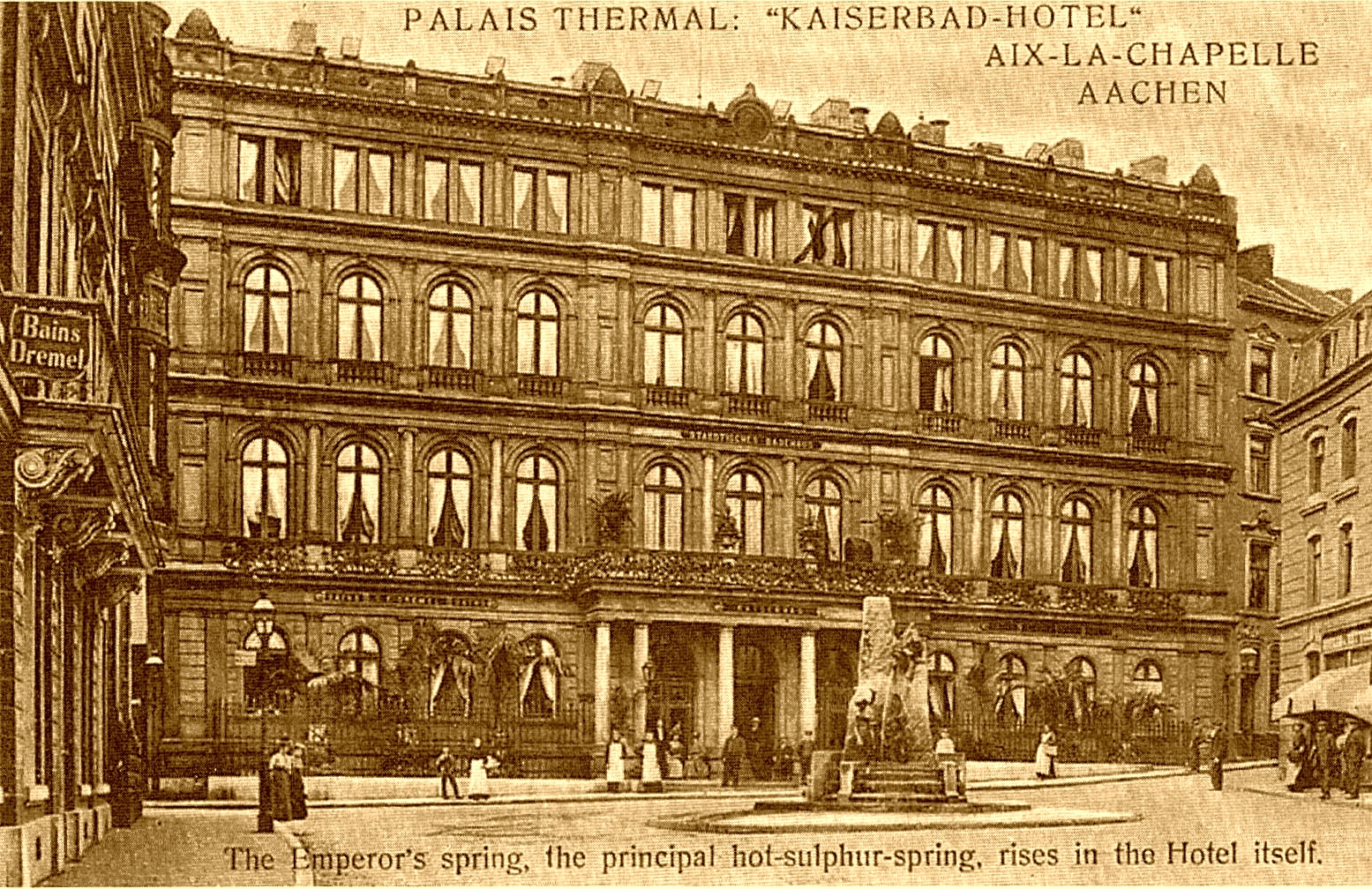
Kaiserbad Thermal Hotel, 1910

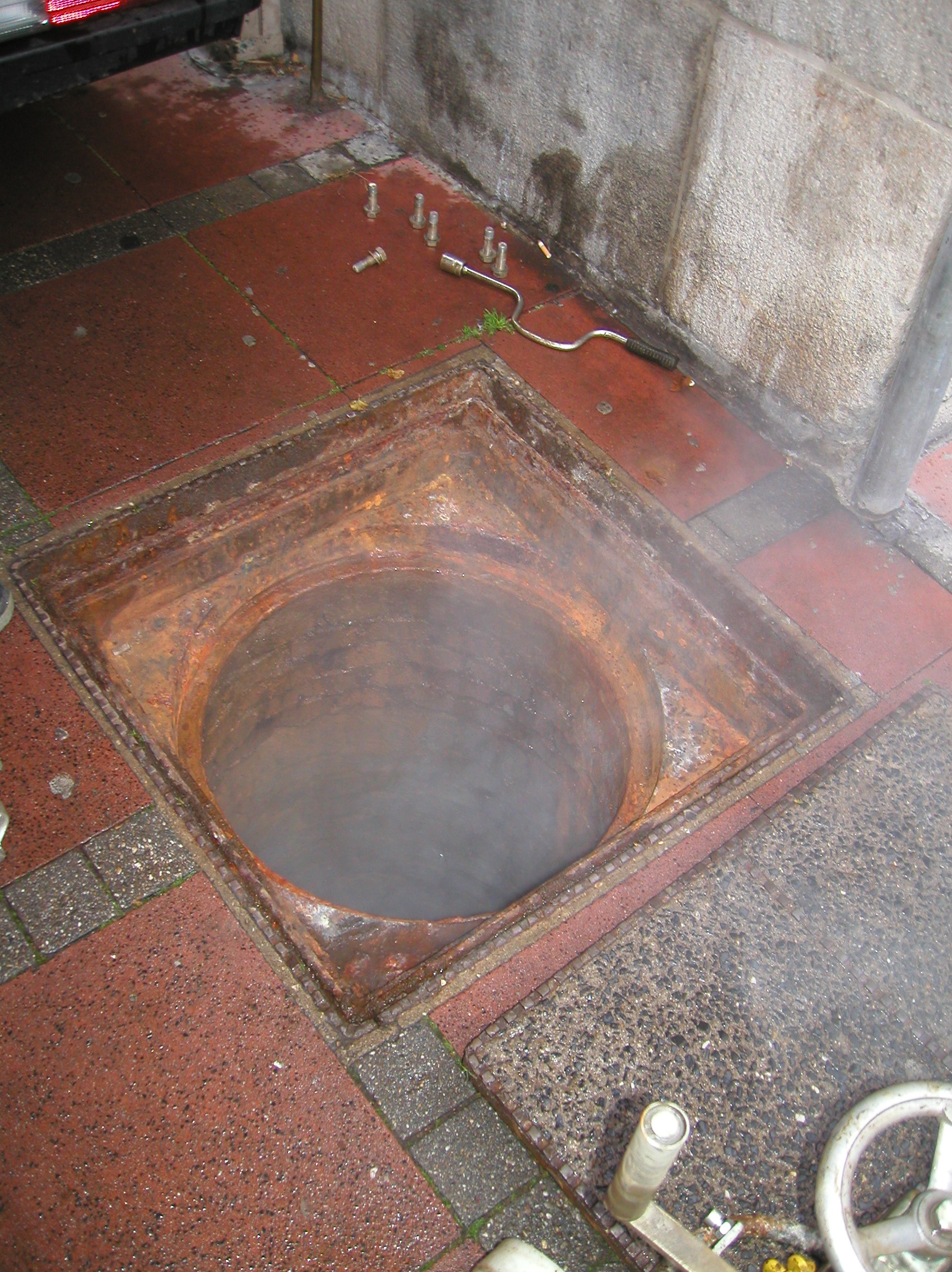
Schlangenbadquelle, Burtscheid

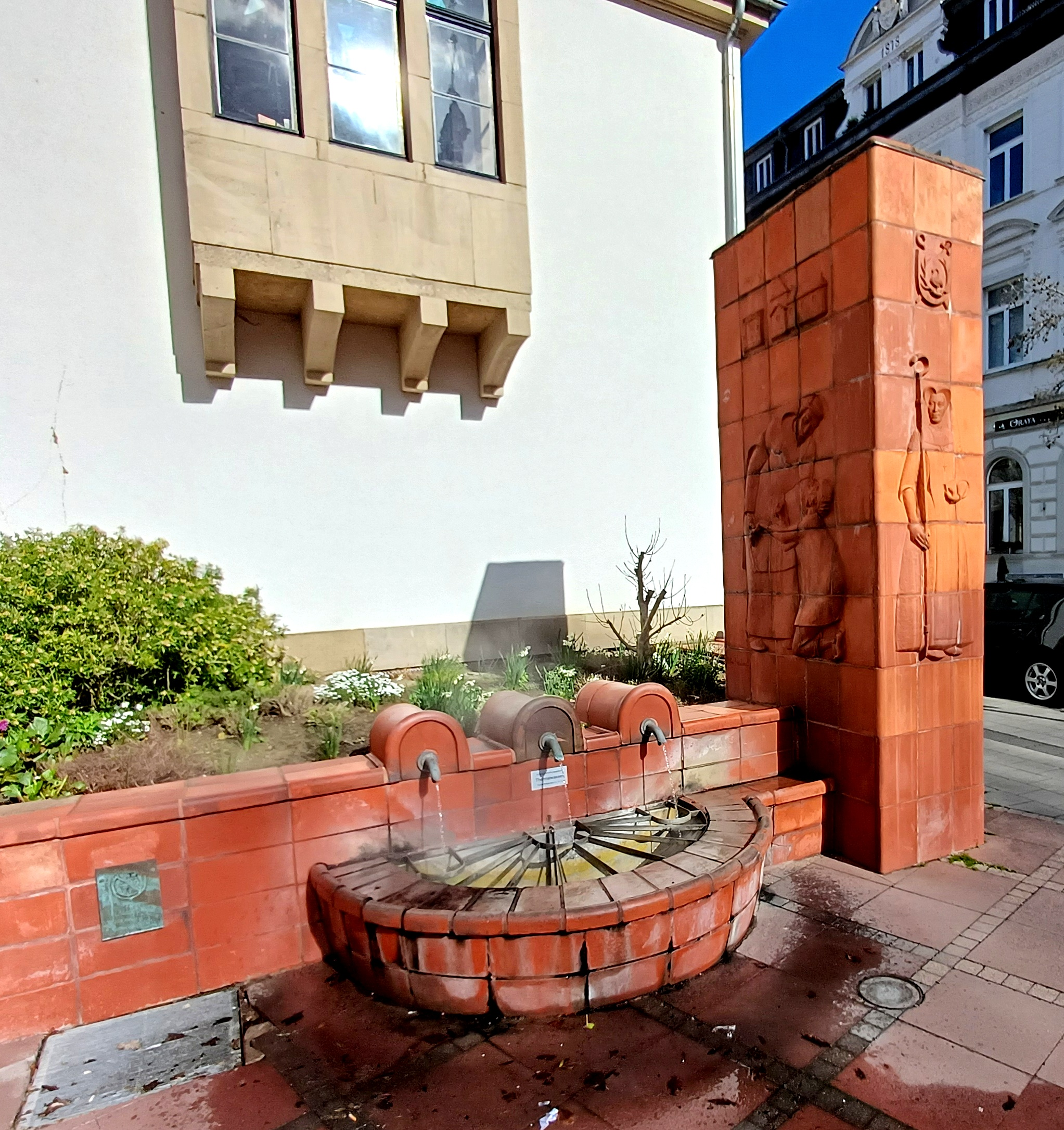
Marktbrunnen in Aachen-Burtscheid

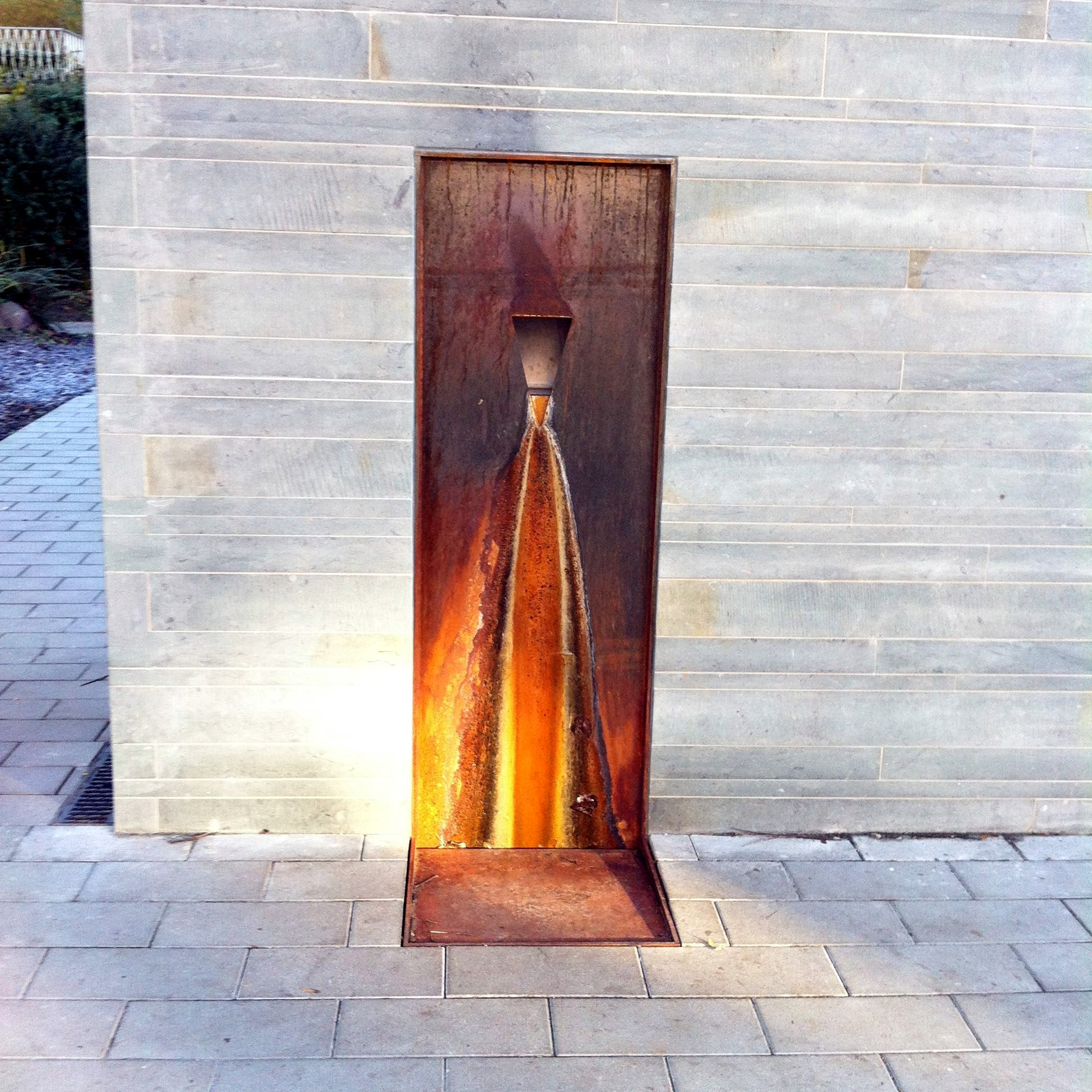
Rosenquelle Burtscheid Auslauf
