= Beaver cloth =

Heavy woolen cloth with a napped surface

Beaver cloth is a heavy woolen cloth with a napped surface. Beaver is a double cloth; it resembles felted beaver-fur and is suitable for outer garments such as coats and hats. The fabric was formerly made in England.

Felted beaver fur had been the material of choice for high-quality hats since the 17th century. Beaver cloth was developed in the 19th century to fulfil demand, as the fur trade had hunted beavers to near extinction in Russia and North America.

== Castor ==
Castor was a cloth lighter than beaver cloth, but otherwise similar. It was produced by using fine wool. Castor was used in overcoating.

== See also ==
- Swansdown
- Nap (fabric)
- Gig-mill
