= Chinchilla (cloth) =

Napped material made from fine wool

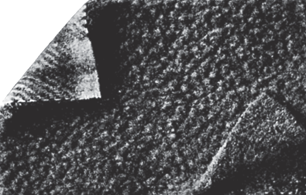
Chinchilla

Chinchilla is a napped material made from fine wool. The surface has tufts very close together.

== Synchilla ==
The development of chinchilla was a milestone in the evolution of fleece. "Synchilla" (Synthetic Chinchilla) was the first generation fleece. In 1985, Synchilla was used in the product "seminal Snap-T pullover" from Patagonia, Inc., which was popular in ski trips across the Northeast.

For many, many years, Synchilla was the Kleenex of fleece, if you will.

— Rob Bondurant, vice president of marketing at Patagonia, The Evolution of Fleece, From Scratchy to Snuggie, New York Times Magazine

== Texture ==
Chinchilla is an imitation of a textile made from the fur of the chinchillas, the South American rodents; the fabric pile is curled up in tufts.

== Use ==
Chinchilla is thick, heavy material preferred for overcoats.
