= Gig-mill =

Machine for raising textile's surface

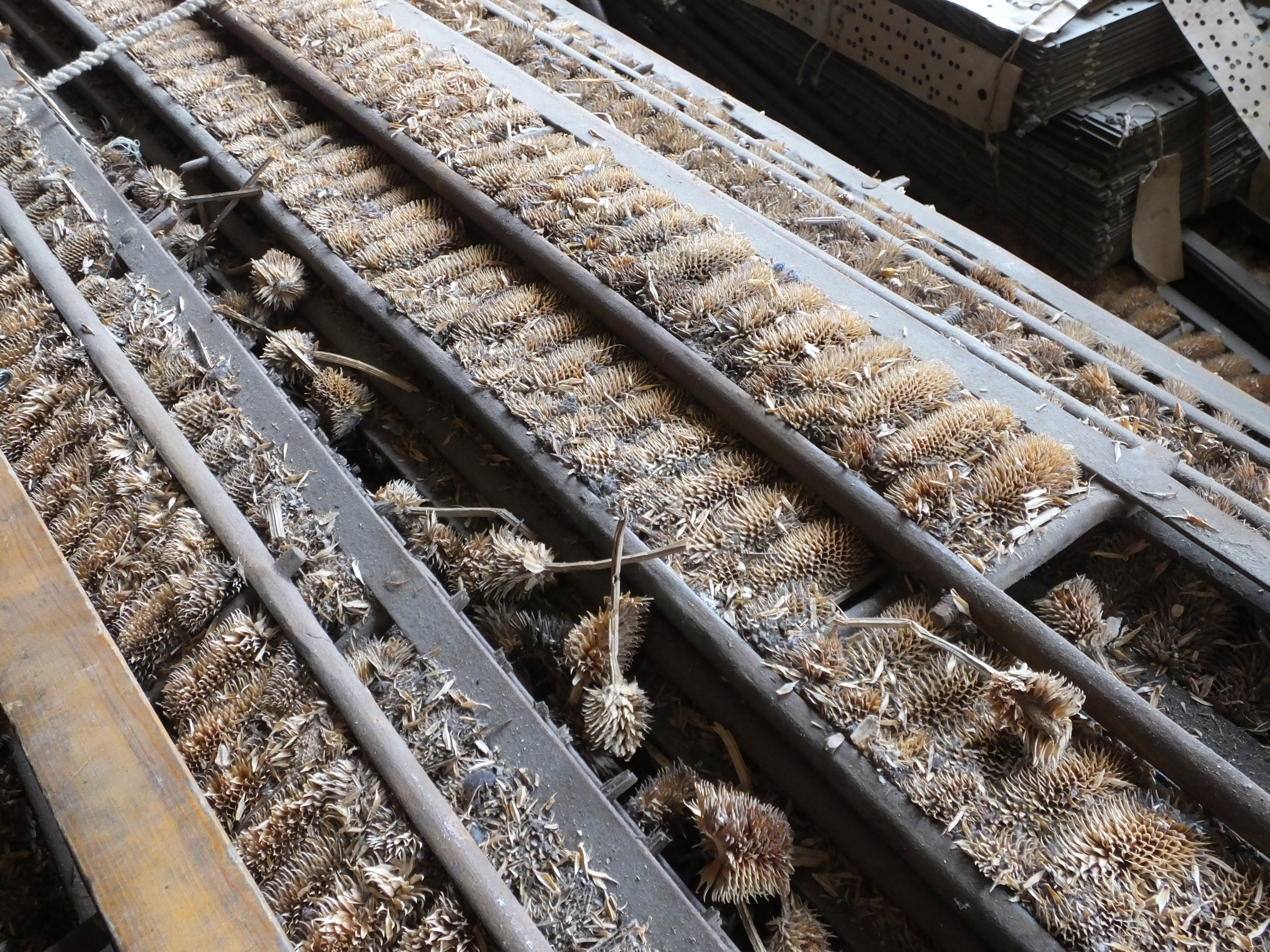
Teasels mounted on frames used to clothe gigging/carding cylinders

A gig-mill (gigging machine, napping machine) was a type of raising machine that used teasels to produce a nap on cloth. Examples of the results of gigging are woolen fabrics such as chinchilla, beaver cloth, and melton. The process involved gradual teasing of the surface to raise the nap. Spelling in some localities is "Gigg".

== Gigging ==
Gigging was an old method of raising. As with flannelette, the fabric surface is treated with sharp teasels during gigging to elevate the surface fibers, providing hairiness and lustrous nap. The fabric gets a soft feel. Teasels from a plant, a thistle-like species, were once used to make it. These were fixed to a cylinder. Later, teasels were replaced by metallic wires similar to those used in carding machines.

== Napped fabrics ==
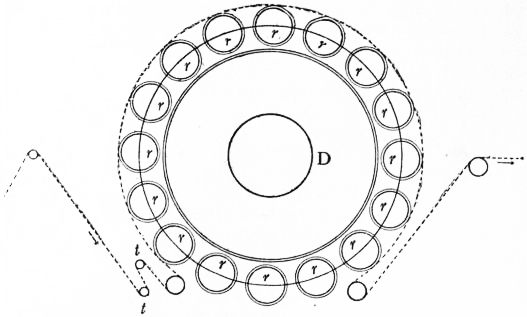
Raising machine

"Napping", "raising" and "gigging" are synonymous terms. Napping is the process of brushing for raising the nap. The raising method is used to draw out the ends of the fibers. Examples of napped fabrics include brushed tricot, and flannelette.

=== Nap ===
Nap in textiles refers to the raised surface.

== Gallery ==
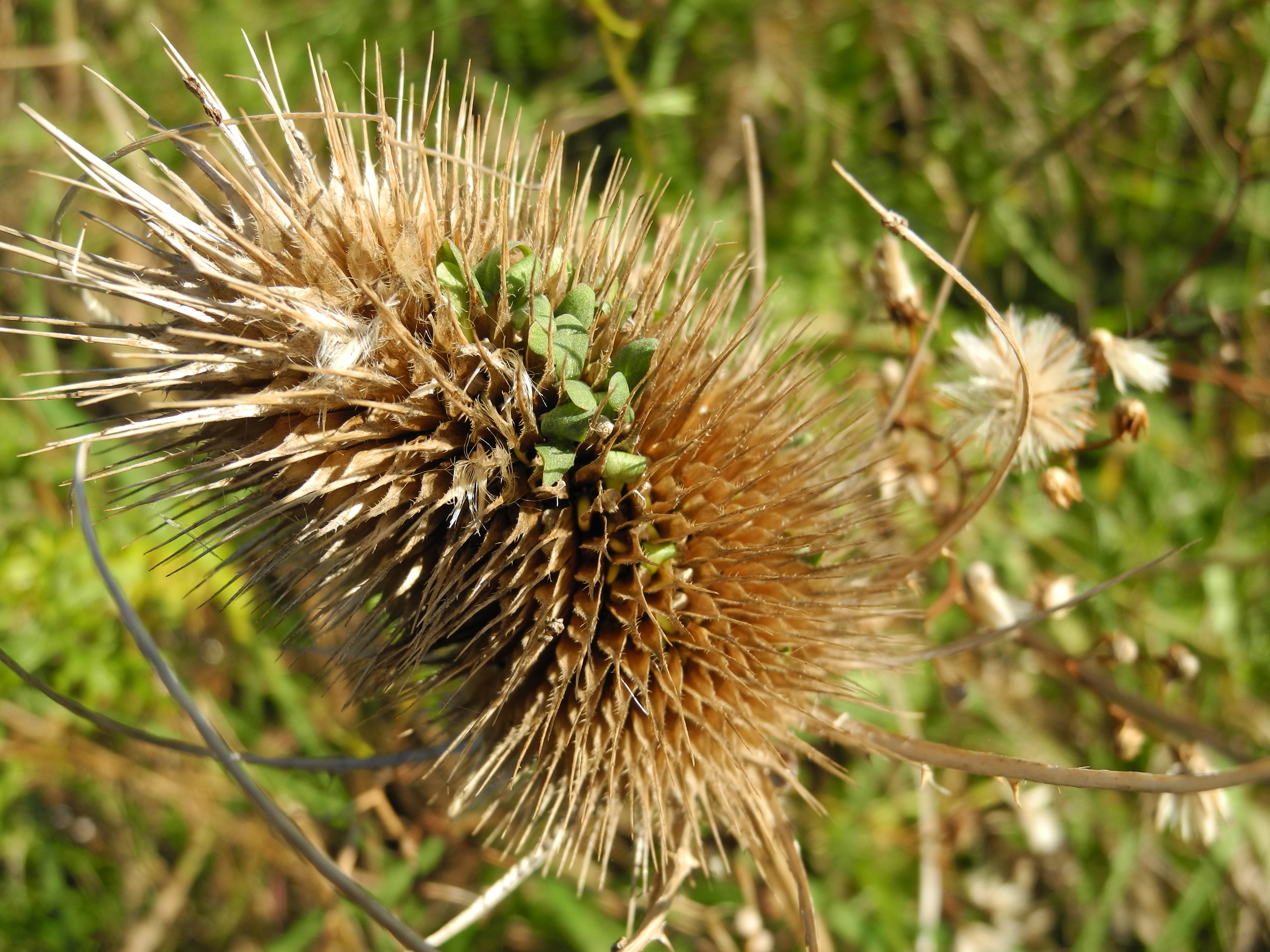
Seedhead of Dipsacus fullonum (common teasel) showing seeds germinating while still in seedhead (vivipary)

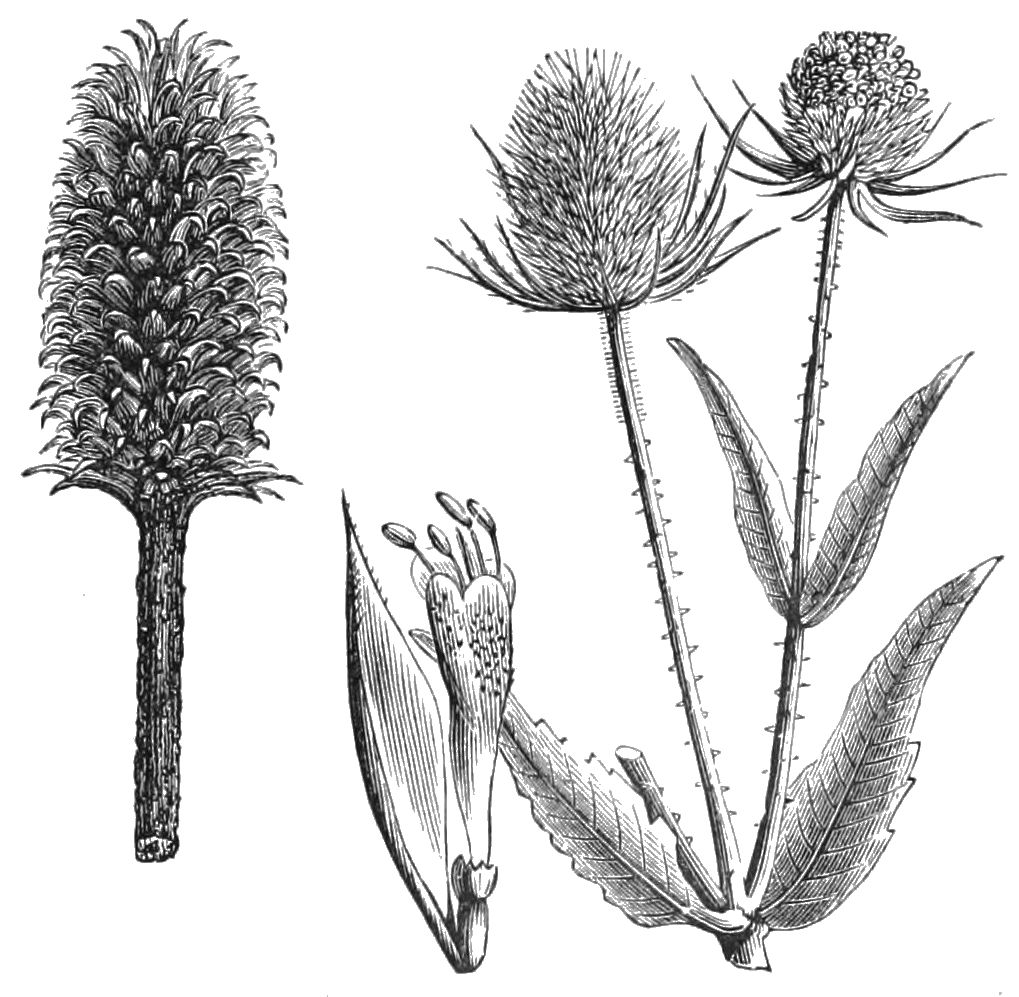
Heads of fuller and wild teasel used in finishing wool fabrics

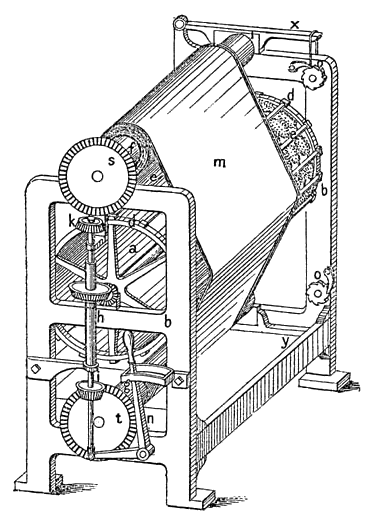
Gigging machine

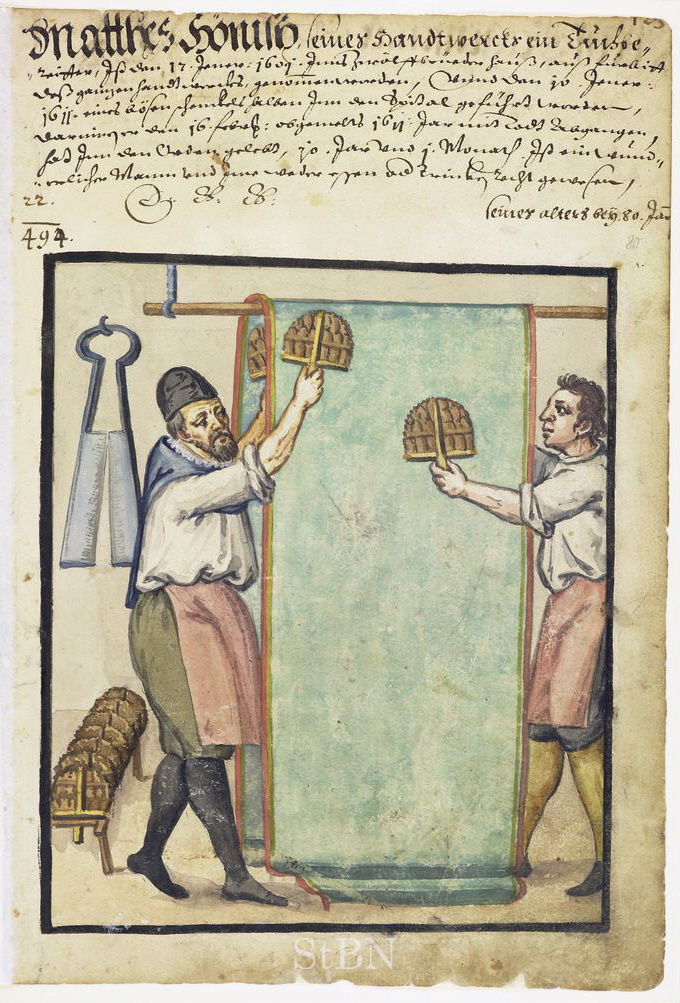
Manual process of raising pile in the textiles

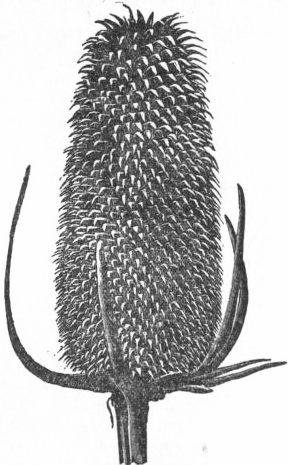
Teasel used for Raising

== See also ==
- Shearing (textiles)
- Aachen fine cloth

== External References ==
- Stroudwater Textile Trust (note local spelling is "Gigg")
