= Polar fleece =

Insulating polyester fabric

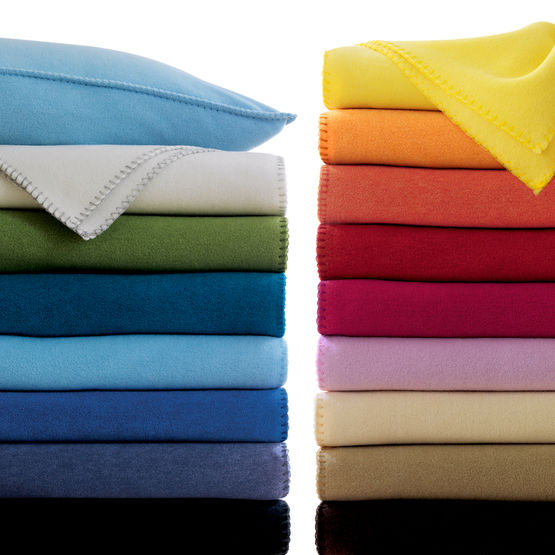
Blankets made out of polar fleece

Polar fleece is a soft fabric made from polyester that is napped and insulating.

PolarFleece is a trademark registered by Malden Mills (now Polartec, LLC) with the United States Patent and Trademark Office on October 6, 1981. Malden Mills developed polar fleece in 1979.

== Uses ==
Polar fleece is used in jackets, hats, sweaters, sweatpants, cloth diapers (nappies), gym clothes, hoodies, pajamas, blankets, and high-performance outdoor clothing. The produced fleece can be used to create clothes that are very light, soft, and easy to wash. Polar fleece can stretch more easily in one direction than in others.

== History ==
Polar fleece originated in Massachusetts in 1979 when Malden Mills and Patagonia developed Synchilla (synthetic chinchilla). It was a new, light, strong pile fabric meant to mimic, and in some ways surpass, wool. Malden Mills CEO Aaron Feuerstein intentionally declined to patent polar fleece, allowing the material to be produced cheaply and widely by many vendors, leading to the material's quick and wide acceptance. Malden Mills registered PolarFleece as a trademark with the United States Patent and Trademark Office on October 6, 1981.

== Characteristics ==
=== Variants ===
A lightweight, warm and soft fabric, fleece has some of wool's good qualities. Polar fleece garments are traditionally available in the micro, 100, 200, and 300 variants, where the numbers represent the fleece's weight in grams per square meter (gsm). The heavier fleece are warmer.

Fleece can range from being high loft to tightly knit. High loft fleece is warmer because it traps tiny air pockets which holds body heat. Traditionally, polar fleece always had a two-sided pile (i.e., they were fluffy on both sides), but now clothes are often advertised as polar fleece even if they lack a two-sided pile. High pile fleece (which have a higher loft), will eventually lose some loft by becoming matted over time. High pile fleece are also more prone to collecting dirt than low pile fleece.

Fleece can also be made out of recycled polyethylene terephthalate (PET) bottles, or even recycled fleece.

=== Maintenance ===
To prevent high pile fleece from matting, they can be brushed regularly (which also removes dirt) and hung rather than folded. To remove already existing matting, rinse it in cool water and while it is still damp, gently and unidirectionally brush the matting out (while optionally lightly spraying it with water), and then use a lint roller. Fleece is machine washable and dries quickly.

Fleece readily generates static electricity, which causes the accumulation of lint, dust, and pet hair. It is also susceptible to damage from high temperature washing, tumble drying, or ironing under unusual conditions. Lower-quality polyester fleece material is also prone to pilling (i.e., the jacket's fabrics break and reform into tiny balls on the jacket).

=== Effectiveness ===
It is hydrophobic, but it is not waterproof and can absorb water. When wet, it holds less than 1% of its weight in water, and depending on its weight takes 1–4 hours to dry. It can dry on the wearer's body in cold temperatures. Fleece loses most of its insulating quality when wet. Regular polar fleece is not windproof.

== Microfiber pollution ==
Washing synthetic textiles like fleece releases microfibers, a type of microplastic. The release of these microfibers into the wastewater is proportional to the microplastic pollution in soil, marine, and freshwater habitats. Studies also show that tumble drying of polyester releases airborne microplastics.

== See also ==
- PrimaLoft
