= Falding =

14th century rough napped woolen fabric

Falding was a rough-napped cloth or frieze that was made in Ireland during the 14th century. It was a colored woolen cloth, variably made with pile or cut pile. There is conflicting information about falding's texture. Some sources describe it as a soft cloth, while others describe it as coarse.

Coarse wool was used to produce falding. It is probable that falding was also made in Northern Europe, and identical to the woollen wraps referred to as "faldones" by Hermoldus.

== Use ==
Falding was comparable to the rough red woolen fabric used for petticoats and jackets by Irish peasants.

== Mentions ==
Geoffrey Chaucer mentioned falding in the prologue to The Canterbury Tales, describing the Shipman as wearing a falding gown.

Sir Arthur Conan Doyle mentions falding in Chapter 3 ("How Hordle John Cozened The Fuller of Lymington") of The White Company, in which the expelled novice Hordle John tricks Peter the fuller into giving up his clothing.
