= Medea (disambiguation) =

Medea is a figure in Greek mythology.

Medea may also refer to:

== Film and television ==
- Medea (1959 film), a film of Dame Judith Anderson's stage play
- Medea (1969 film), a film by Pier Paolo Pasolini
- Medea (1988 film), a film by Lars von Trier
- Médée (2001 film), a French film
- Medea (2017 film), a Costa Rican film
- Medea (2021 film), a Russian film by Alexander Zeldovich
- Medea (2022 film), a Russian film by Igor Voloshin
- Medea (TV serial), a 2005 TV serial by Theo van Gogh

== Literature ==
- Medea: Harlan's World, a 1985 collection of short science-fiction stories by various authors
- Medea (The Icemark Chronicles), a character from The Icemark Chronicles by Stuart Hill
- Medea, a 1996 novel by Christa Wolf
- Medea, a fictional character; see List of Saint Seiya Omega characters

=== Theatre ===
- Medea (play), an ancient Greek play by Euripides
- Medea (Seneca), a 1st-century AD play by Seneca the Younger
- Médée, a 1635 play by Pierre Corneille
- Medea (Johnson play) a 1730 play by Charles Johnson
- Medea, a 1761 play by Richard Glover
- Medea, an 1821 play by Franz Grillparzer
- Medea (Anouilh), a 1946 play by Jean Anouilh
- Medea, a 1946 play translated by Robinson Jeffers
- Medea (Fo play), a 1977 play by Dario Fo
- Medea, the Musical, a 1994 musical comedy by John Fisher
- Médée, an 1898 play by Catulle Mendès

== Music ==
- Medea, a 1993 album (released on Cleopatra Records) by Sex Gang Children
- Medea (ballet), music for ballet by Samuel Barber
- Medea (EP), a 2007 EP by Michou
- Medea (Ex Libris album) (2014)
- "Medea", a song by God Is an Astronaut from the album Epitaph
- "Medea", a song by Khoma from The Second Wave
- Medea, a 2004 piece for soprano, clarinet, cello and piano by Guillaume Connesson
- Medea, for three violoncelli, three electric guitars, percussion and electronics, by Dietmar Bonnen
- Médée, an orchestral suite by Vincent d'Indy

=== Opera ===
- Médée (Charpentier), a 1693 opera by Marc-Antoine Charpentier
- Medea (Benda), a 1775 opera by Georg Benda
- Médée (Cherubini), a 1797 opera by Luigi Cherubini
- Medea in Corinto, an 1813 opera by Simon Mayr
- Medea (Pacini), an 1843 opera by Giovanni Pacini
- Medea (Mercadante), an 1851 opera by Saverio Mercadante
- Medea, a 1906 opera by Vincenzo Tommasini
- Médée (Milhaud), a 1939 opera by Darius Milhaud
- Medea, a 1984 opera by Gavin Bryars
- Medea, a 1988 opera by Mikis Theodorakis
- Medea (Reimann), a 2010 opera by Aribert Reimann

== Places ==
- Médéa Province, Algeria
- Médéa, the capital city of Médéa Province
  - Olympique de Médéa, an association football club
- Medea, Friuli-Venezia Giulia, Italy
- Medea (Thrace) or Kıyıköy, a village in Vize, Kırklareli Province, Turkey
- Medea Dome, a snow dome in Antarctica
- Medea (Lousberg), a former open-air stage on the Lousberg, Aachen, Germany

== Vehicles ==
- Medea (yacht)
- Medea-class destroyer
- HMS Medea (1778), a 28-gun sixth rate
- French frigate Médée (1778), a 36-gun fifth rate
- HMS M22 or HMS Medea, an M15-class monitor launched in 1915
- SS Medea (1946–1951, a French coastal tanker
- HMAS Medea, an Australian auxiliary minesweeper (1912–1948)
- HMS Medea, a list of ships named HMS Medea

== Visual arts ==
- Medea (Sandys painting), an 1868 painting by Frederick Sandys
- Medea statue (2007), a statue of Medea in Batumi, Georgia
- Medea, an 1870 painting by Anselm Feuerbach
- Medea (Artemisia Gentileschi), an oil painting by Artemisia Gentileschi

== Other uses ==
- Medea (name)
- 212 Medea, an asteroid
- Maternal effect dominant embryonic arrest (Medea), a selfish gene
- MEDEA Collaborative Media Initiative, new media research centre at Malmö University, Sweden
- Measurements of Earth Data for Environmental Analysis, a project of the United States Intelligence Community
- Croton (plant) or Medea, a plant genus
- Medea gene, the Drosophila melanogaster common mediator Smad gene
- Medea, a Fate/stay night character
- Princess Medea, a character in the video game, Dragon Quest VIII
- Medea complex, a term for parents who murder or otherwise harm their children; see Greek mythology in popular culture#Social science

== See also ==
- Crypt of Medea, a 1984 video game
- Freispruch für Medea, a 1992 opera by Rolf Liebermann
- Jason and Medea (disambiguation)
- Madea, a fictional character created by Tyler Perry
- Medea hypothesis, the hypothesis that life, understood as a superorganism, is suicidal
- Medes, an ancient Iranian people
- Media (disambiguation)
