= Medial =

Medial may refer to:

== Mathematics ==
- Medial magma, an algebraic structure satisfying the medial identity

=== Geometry ===
- Medial axis, in geometry the set of all points having more than one closest point on an object's boundary
- Medial graph, another graph that represents the adjacencies between edges in the faces of a plane graph
- Medial triangle, the triangle whose vertices lie at the midpoints of an enclosing triangle's sides
- Polyhedra:
  - Medial deltoidal hexecontahedron
  - Medial disdyakis triacontahedron
  - Medial hexagonal hexecontahedron
  - Medial icosacronic hexecontahedron
  - Medial inverted pentagonal hexecontahedron
  - Medial pentagonal hexecontahedron
  - Medial rhombic triacontahedron

== Linguistics ==
- A medial sound or letter is one that is found in the middle of a larger unit (like a word)
  - Syllable medial, a segment located between the onset and the rime of a syllable
- In the older literature, a term for the voiced stops (like b, d, g)
- Medial or second person demonstrative, a demonstrative indicating things near the addressee

== Anatomy ==
- Medial (anatomy), term of location meaning 'towards the centre'
- Medial ligament (disambiguation), term used for various ligaments toward the midline of the human body
- Medial rotation, rotation toward the centre of the body

== See also ==
- Medial border (disambiguation)
- Medial plantar (disambiguation)
- Medial wall (disambiguation)
- Median (disambiguation)
- Medial capitals or CamelCase, use of capital letters in the middle of a compound word or abbreviation
- Mid vowel, a vowel sound pronounced with the tongue midway between open and closed vowel positions
- Medial s <ſ>, a form of the letter s written in the middle of a word
- Human anatomical terms § Standard terms
