= Medio =

Medio (Spanish for "half") may refer to:

- Mediopassive voice in grammar
- Dolores Medio, a Spanish writer
- Medio Creek in Texas
- Arroyo del Medio in Argentina
- Medio, a company
- Medio, any of various halfpieces of currency across Latin America, especially
  - Any of several half-real coins
  - Any of several 5 centavo coins, approximating the notional amount of half a 1/8-peso real following decimalization

== See also ==
- Media (disambiguation)
- Medium (disambiguation)
