= Aachen Prison =

Penal facility

Coordinates: 50°48′3″N 6°5′55″E

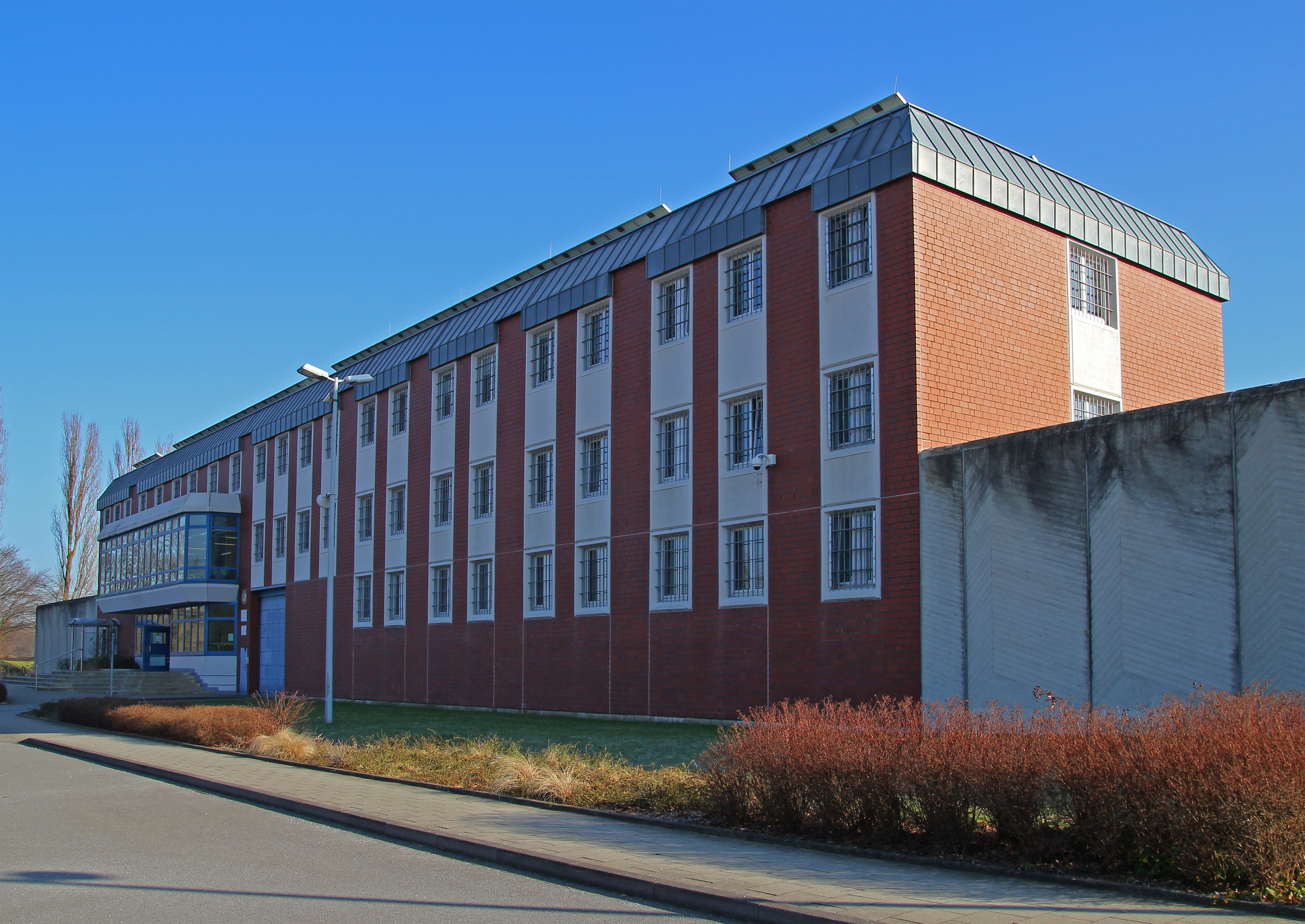
Prison entrance

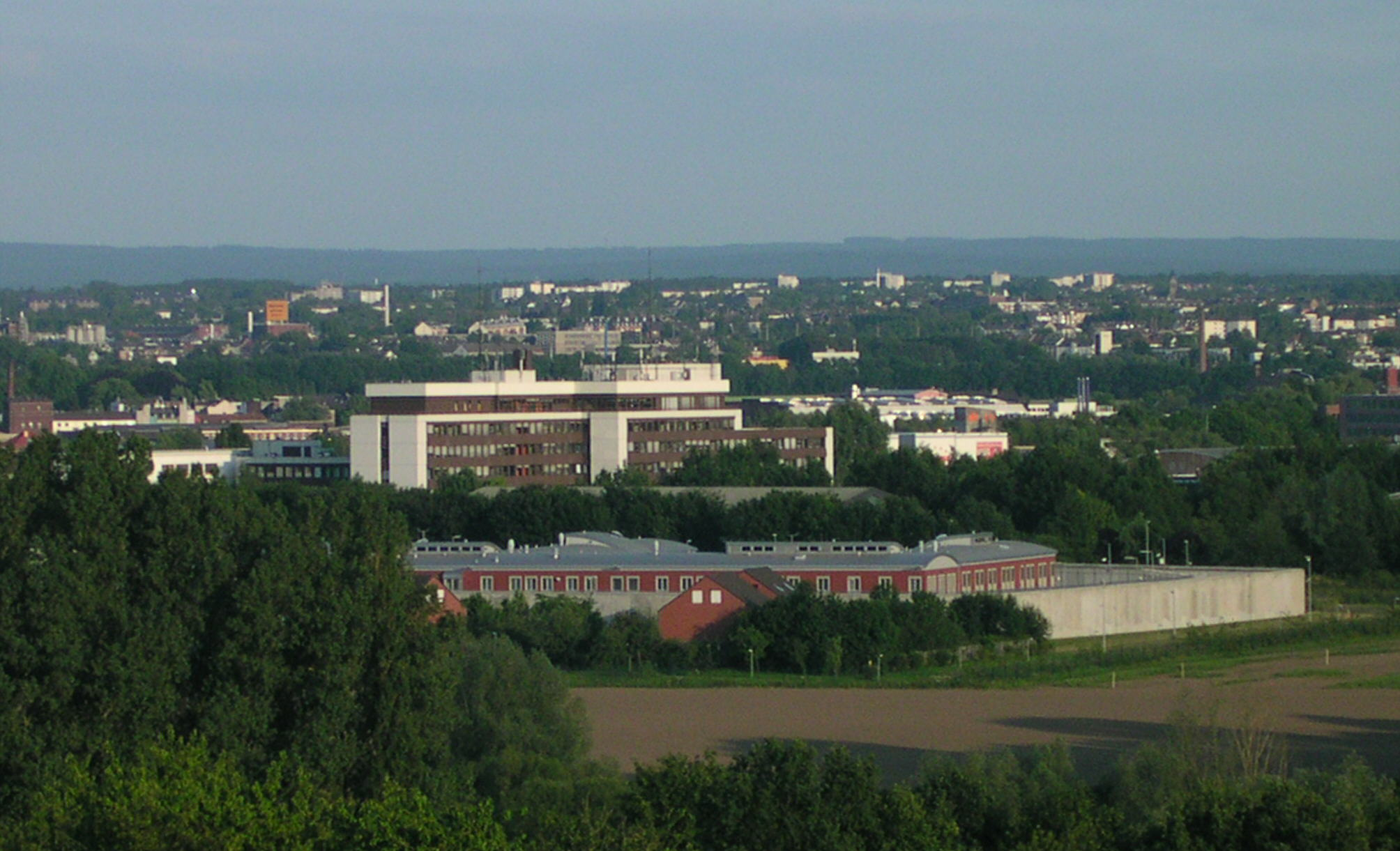
Police headquarters and prison

Aachen Prison is a penal facility located in the Soers in Aachen, North Rhine-Westphalia, Germany. As of 2007, 800 criminals were serving their sentences in the prison. Brigitte Kerzl serves as the director of the prison.

On 26 November 2009, two dangerous prisoners escaped from the prison but were later caught.
