= Midea =

Midea may refer to:

- Midea Group (美的集团), a Chinese electrical appliance manufacturer
- Midea, Greece, a Greek town
- Midea (Argolid), a citadel in the town of the same name
- Midea or Mideia, name of four figures in Greek mythology
- Midea, a genus of mites in the suborder Prostigmata
- Midea (moth), formerly a genus of moths (now Arsacia)
- Midea, formerly a genus of butterflies (now Anthocharis)

== See also ==
- Media (disambiguation)
- Mideia (Boeotia), a town of ancient Boeotia
