= Media =

Media may refer to:

== Communication ==
- Media (communication), tools and channels used to deliver information or data
  - Advertising media, various media, content, buying and placement for advertising
  - Interactive media, media that is interactive
  - Media adequacy, specific aspects important for a successful transfer of information
  - MEDIA sub-programme of Creative Europe, a European Union initiative to support the European audiovisual sector
  - New media, the combination of traditional media and information and communications technology
  - Print media, communications delivered via paper or canvas
  - Recording medium, devices used to store information
  - Mass media, the institutions and methods of reaching a large audience
    - Broadcast media, communications delivered over mass electronic communication networks
    - News media, mass media focused on communicating news
    - Published media, any media made available to the public
  - Electronic media, communications delivered via electronic or electromechanical means
    - Digital media, digitized representations of information such as audio, video, images and text
      - Hypermedia, media with hyperlinks
      - Multimedia, communications that incorporate multiple forms of information content and processing (e.g., images, video, audio, and text)
    - Social media, internet-based ways of communicating with a social network

== Places ==
=== United States ===
- Media, Illinois
- Media, Kansas
- Media, Pennsylvania
- Media Township, Henderson County, Illinois

=== Other places ===
- Media (region), a region of northwestern Iran
- Median kingdom, a kingdom and empire controlled by and extending beyond the region
- Media, Africa, an Ancient city and former bishopric, now a Latin Catholic titular see in Algeria
- Media (castra), a fort in the Roman province of Dacia

== Arts, entertainment, and media ==
- Media (album), the 1998 album by The Faint
- Media, a 2017 American TV thriller film directed by Craig Ross Jr.
- List of art media, materials and techniques used by an artist to produce a work of art

== Computing ==
- Media player (software), for playing audio and video
- Storage media, in data storage devices

== Life sciences ==
- Media, a group of insect wing veins in the Comstock-Needham system
- Growth medium, objects in which microorganisms or cells can experience growth
- Media filter, a filter consisting of several different filter materials
- Tunica media, the middle layer of the wall of a blood vessel

== Transport ==
- Media (automobile company)
- Media (AK-83), a World War II US Navy ship that was never commissioned
- RMS Media, a Cunard Line cargo liner in service 1948–61

== See also ==
- Mediaș, Sibiu, Transylvania, Romania
- Medium (disambiguation)
- Medea (disambiguation)
- Midea (disambiguation)
