= Medium =

Medium may refer to:

== Arts, entertainment, and media ==
=== Films ===
- The Medium (1921 film), a German silent film
- The Medium (1951 film), a film version of the opera directed by Menotti
- The Medium (1960 film), an Australian television play
- The Medium (1992 film), an English film from Singapore
- The Medium (2021 film), a Thai film
- Medium, a series of Indian comedy-drama films
  - Hindi Medium, 2017 film by Saket Chaudhary
  - Angrezi Medium (English Medium), 2020 film by Homi Adajania

=== Publications ===
- Medium (website), an online publishing platform

==== Student Periodicals ====
- The Medium (Rutgers), an entertainment weekly at Rutgers University
- The Medium (University of Toronto Mississauga), a student newspaper at the University of Toronto Mississauga

=== Other arts, entertainment, and media ===
- List of art media (plural: media), materials and techniques used by an artist to produce a work
- Medium (band), an American rock band
- Medium (TV series), an American television series starring Patricia Arquette about a medium (psychic intermediary) working as a consultant for a district attorney's office
- Medium Productions, a record label
- The Medium, a 1946 opera by Gian-Carlo Menotti
- The Medium (video game), a 2021 psychological horror video game developed by Bloober Team.

== People ==
- Tau (rapper) (born 1986), Polish rapper formerly known as "Medium"

== Science and technology ==
=== Astronomy ===
- Interplanetary medium, material that fills the Solar System
- Interstellar medium, the matter and energy between a galaxy's stars

=== Communication ===
- Media (communication), tools used to store and deliver information or data
- Medium of instruction, a language or other tool used to educate, train, or instruct

=== Wave physics ===
- Transmission medium, in physics and telecommunications, any material substance which can propagate waves or energy
  - Active laser medium (also called gain medium or lasing medium), a quantum system that allows amplification of power (gain) of waves passing through (usually by stimulated emission)
  - Optical medium, in physics, a material through which electromagnetic waves propagate
- Excitable medium, a non-linear dynamic system which has the capacity to propagate a wave

=== Other uses in science and technology ===
- Data storage medium, a storage container in computing
- Growth medium (or culture medium), in biotechnology, an object in which microorganisms or cells experience growth
- Porous medium, in engineering and earth sciences, a material that allows fluid to pass through it, such as sand

== Other uses ==
- Medium bomber, a class of warplane
- Medium, a doneness (gradation of cooked meat)
- Medium, a practitioner of mediumship, the practice of purportedly mediating communication between spirits of the dead and living human beings
- Medium pace bowling, another name for fast bowling in the sport of cricket

== See also ==
- Channel (disambiguation)
- Conduit (disambiguation)
- Media (disambiguation)
- Median (disambiguation)
- Meidum, a pyramid in Egypt
