= Lousberg =

Hill in Aachen, Germany

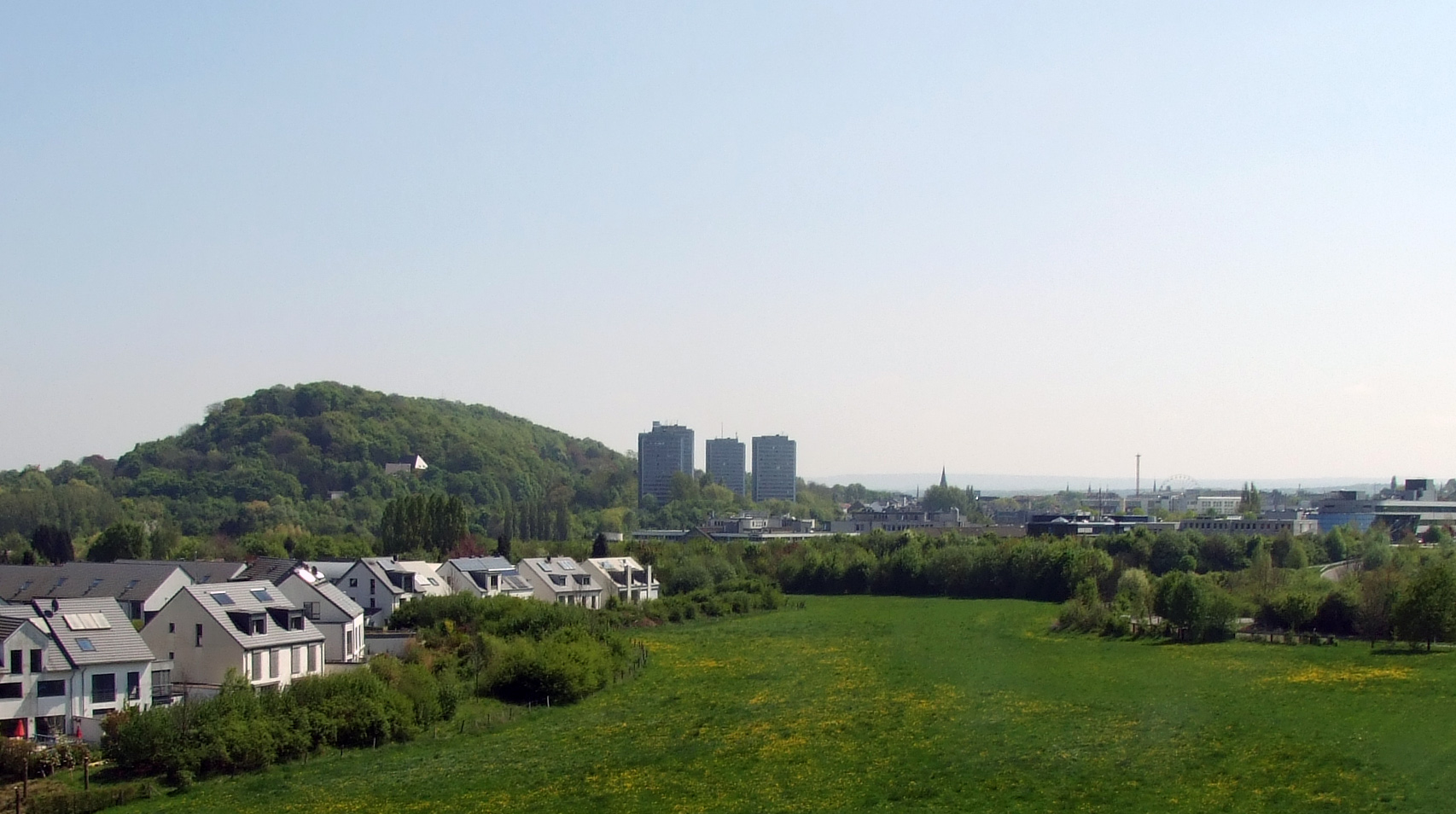
- View of the Lousberg from Laurensberg

Highest point
- Elevation: 264DE-NHN
- Coordinates: 50°47′13″N 6°4′45″E

Geography
- Location: Aachen, North Rhine-Westphalia, Germany

At 264 meters, the Lousberg (historically sometimes also spelled Louisberg, Luisberg or Loysberg) is a prominent elevation on the northern edge of the historic center of Aachen, which was laid out as a forest and mountain park at the beginning of the 19th century according to plans by Maximilian Friedrich Weyhe. The origin of the name is not entirely clear. It could come from lousen ("to look"), since the mountain offers an excellent panoramic view, or it could be traced back to Louis the Pious, the son of Charlemagne. Another explanation has to do with the Aachen dialect term lous, which means "clever".

== Geology, formation ==
Geologically, the Lousberg is one of Aachen's three inlier mountains, along with the Salvatorberg and the Wingertsberg, and one of the southernmost foothills of the Aachen-Limburg Cretaceous. It was formed during the Upper Cretaceous, when the region around Aachen was affected by a Europe-wide marine transgression, during which initially sandy and later predominantly calcareous sediments were deposited (Aachen Formation). The morphological elevation of the Lousberg is related to the tectonic movements that led to the formation of the Lower Rhine Bight.

At the foot of the Lousberg, dark gray, clayey to sandy sediments of the so-called Hergenrath layers were deposited, which formed in a swampy river delta. Silicified wood, charcoal, and numerous concretions of marcasite are embedded in these layers. Due to the water-storing properties of the deposits, the clay of the Hergenrath layers forms the most important spring horizon in the region, both on the Lousberg and in the Aachen Forest.

Subsequently, during the Upper Cretaceous, the area was gradually submerged by the sea, and 30–50 m thick quartz sands of the Aachen Formation were deposited, which were mined in small sand pits on the lower slopes of the Lousberg (e.g. at the present playground at the end of Kupferstraße). There is a clear erosional unconformity between the sands of the Aachen Formation and the younger Vaals Formation of the Campanian. The sands of the Vaals Formation are characterized by an increased occurrence of glauconite. Because of their greenish-brown weathering color, these beds were formerly known as the Vaals Green Sands.

In the Campanian, tectonic movements began to increase, which are associated with the sinking of the Lower Rhine Bight and led to the uplift of the Lousberg Floe. The Vijlen and Orsbach limestones were probably not primarily sedimented due to their high altitude.

It was not until the Maastrichtian that the Lousberg Floe was submerged again due to a rise in sea level. Dead microorganisms were deposited in a calcareous mud, which today forms the so-called Vetschau limestone. The original thickness of the limestone layer on the Lousberg was about 6 meters. The upper 4.5 meters contained layers of brown flint, which were the subject of a Neolithic quarry. All but a small amount of the flint was quarried, and the unused limestone material was dumped on the surrounding slopes. Due to the poor consolidation of this debris, small landslides still occur today, as evidenced by the uprooted trees and cracks in the footpaths.

== Fauna and flora ==
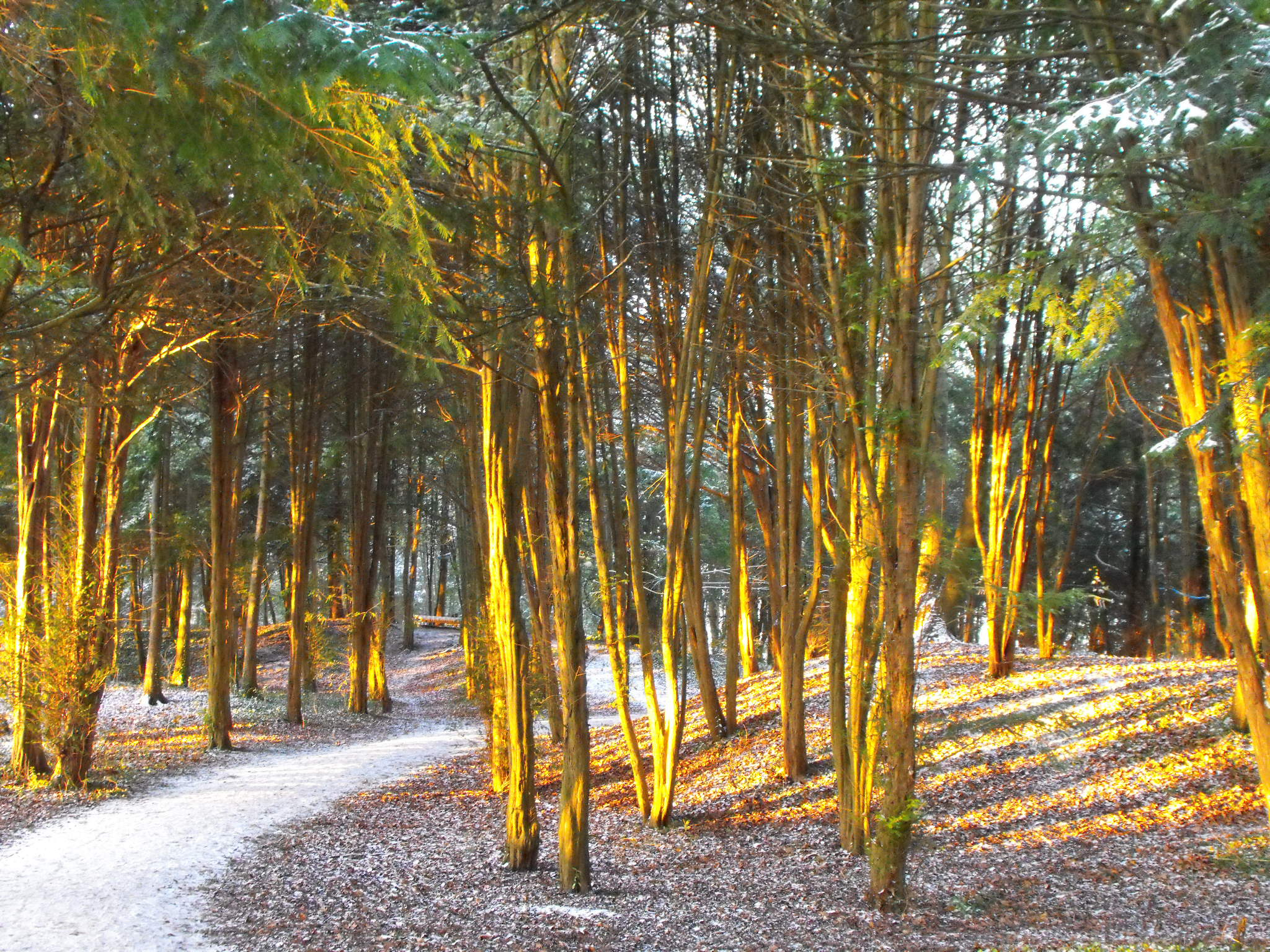
Yew forest on the slag heaps of the Neolithic flint quarry

From an ornithological point of view, the Lousberg is very rich in species, as studies carried out by the RWTH Aachen University have shown. The population of bats, amphibians, and reptiles is also remarkable. The amphibians find spawning waters in the Soers north of the Lousberg. There is a continuous yew forest on the plateau. In the former St. Raphael monastery park to the north, the listed Müschpark, there are extensive stands of wild daffodils.

== History ==
During the Neolithic period, about 5500 to 5000 years ago, flint was mined and worked intensively on the Lousberg. This gray flint, easily recognizable by its characteristic chocolate-brown color zones, was used to make axes and other tools, most of which were polished on-site or brought to settlements as semi-finished products.

The striking coloration of the Lousberg flint makes it a suitable object for studying the distribution of axe blades. The ^{14}C dates of the artifacts found in the Lousberg overburden indicate that the mine was in operation between 3500 and 3000 B.C. Calculations based on the volume of the overburden, the weight of the production waste, and the average weight of the axe blades suggest that about 300000 axe blanks left the Lousberg. These axe blanks were distributed as far as Belgium (Thieusies, about 160 km by air), central Hesse (Büdingen, about 225 km by air), and eastern Westphalia (Neuenknick near Minden, about 280 km by air).

The Stone Age mining of flint has almost completely reclaimed the central plateau of the Lousberg, which originally consisted of a 6 m thick layer of calcareous limestone. The resulting dumps, up to 4.5 meters thick, are still visible today as a hilly landscape under the yew grove. Finished axes and flint flakes have been found in the area and on the steep slopes.

During the Roman occupation, the limestone was used to build the thermal baths of Aachen, and in the Middle Ages, it was used in the construction of Barbarossa's Wall.

At the beginning of the 19th century, the Napoleonic geographer Jean Joseph Tranchot began the topographic survey of the Rhineland at the scale of 1:20000, starting from a triangulation point on the Lousberg. On 17 October 1807 the French Ministry of War erected a bluestone obelisk in honor of Tranchot and his colleagues, based on a design by the engineering geographer Capitaine Boucher. The obelisk is a precisely measured central point that served as a starting point for astronomical observations and mapping in the region. From there, other points in the area were determined using the triangulation method, which eventually allowed the entire area to be mapped. When Napoleon was deposed on 2 April 1814 the monument was destroyed. On 15 May 1815 the obelisk was re-erected by order of the Prussian Baron Karl von Müffling, who continued the surveying work on behalf of the Kingdom of Prussia. The inscription praising Napoleon was replaced by the inscription that can still be read today. The damage to the edges of the stone was compensated by chamfering, which is untypical for an obelisk.

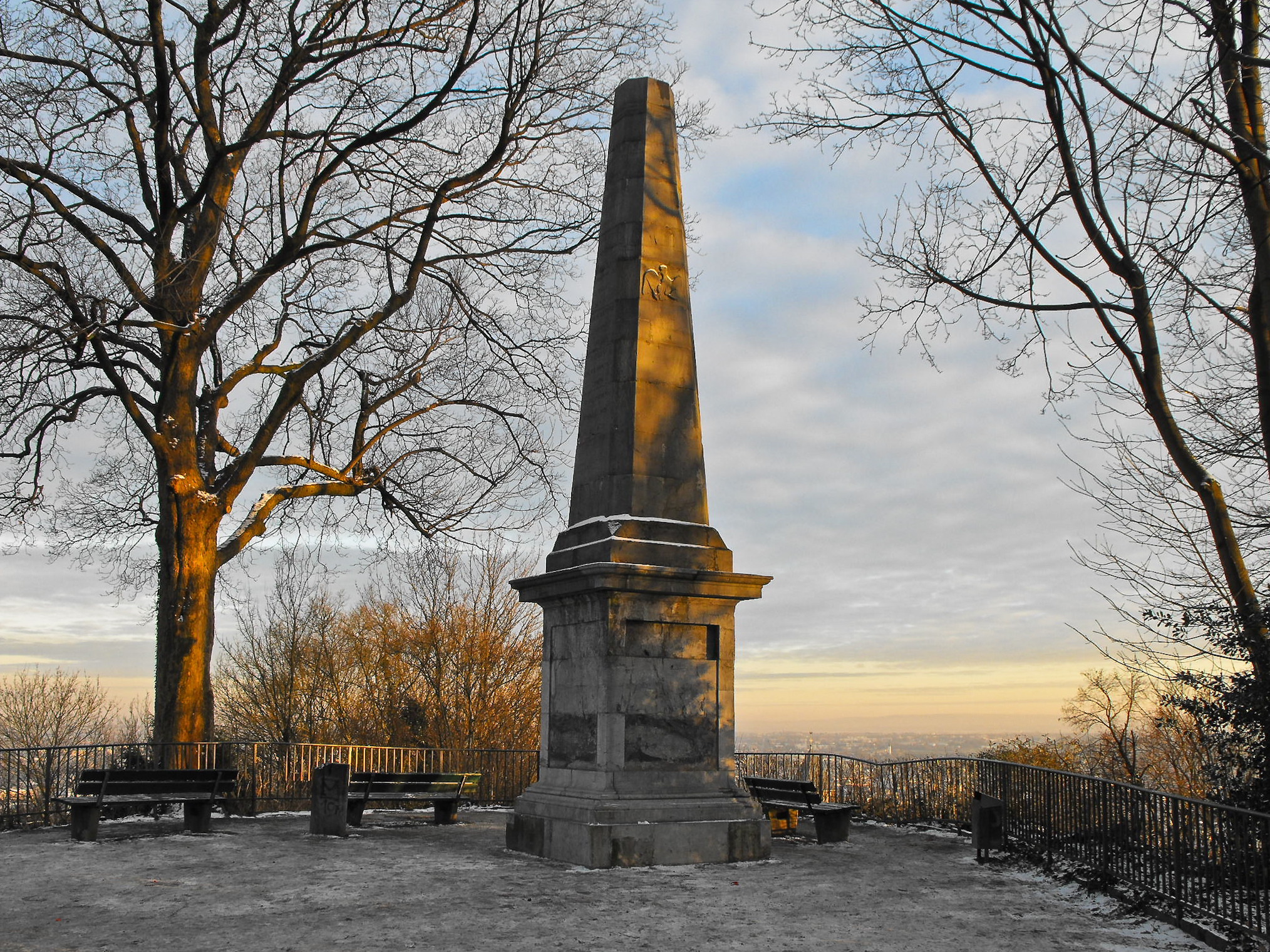
The obelisk on the Lousberg

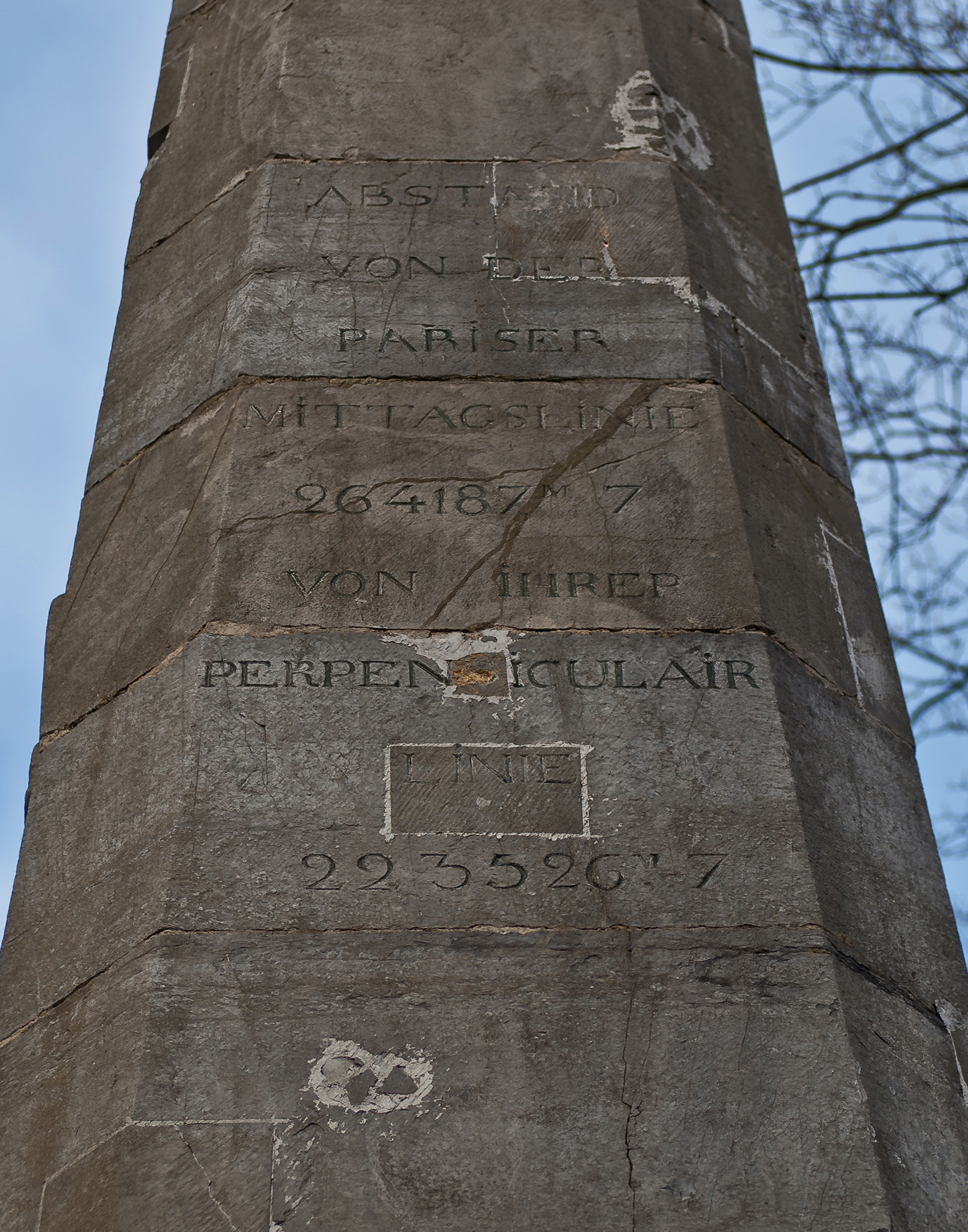
Inscription on the obelisk

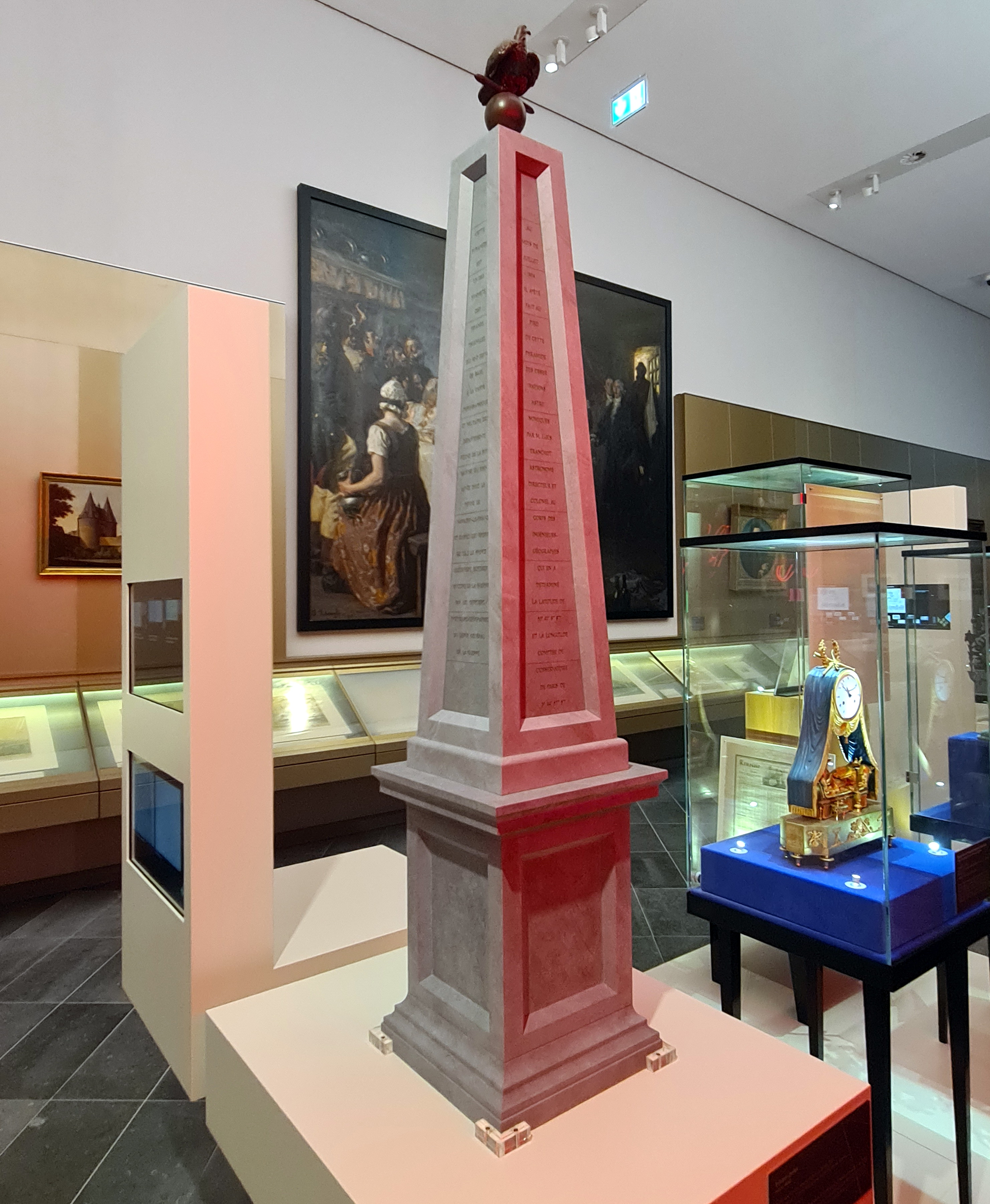
Model in the Centre Charlemagne

It was at this time that the first landscape park in Europe, initiated by citizens (and not by princes), was created on the Lousberg. These efforts were closely linked to the embellishments ordered by Napoleon in 1804, which included the "repair and embellishment of the baths" and the creation of "walks" on the filled-in trenches of the outer city fortifications. The idea of planting the Lousberg is said to have originated in 1806 and to have been promoted by Johann Wilhelm Körfgen (1769–1829), secretary general of the prefecture of the département of Roer. The idea of a park on the Lousberg was combined with the idea of building a society house called the "Belvédère" on the southeastern slope of the mountain. To this end, several citizens, under the chairmanship of Körfgen, joined in a specially created corporation whose purpose was to promote tourism. While the public authorities had to provide the land for the project and carry out the planting work, it was up to the limited company to raise the funds to build the society house. The first plantings on the Lousberg were commissioned in 1807 by Alexandre de Lameth, the prefect of the département of Roer. The plans for the park, based on the principles of the English landscape garden, were drawn up by the court gardener Maximilian Friedrich Weyhe of Düsseldorf, who had also been commissioned by Lameth to submit plans for the redesign of the outer moats. The overall project was overseen by a "Committee for Embellishments," established in 1807. The Lousberg, which had been more or less bare and used as a sheep pasture, was transformed into a wooded park with an extensive tree population by 1818. The society house was built between 1807 and 1810.

Its dilapidation was complained about as early as 1818. In 1827–1828 the building was renovated and enlarged under the direction of Adam Franz Friedrich Leydel. On 29 August 1836 the Society House burned down completely after a ball. In 1838 it was rebuilt in the neoclassical style according to Leydel's plans and later renovated and expanded according to Friedrich Joseph Ark's plans. Known as the Belvedere, it functioned as both a restaurant and a casino. It was a popular destination for walkers, along with other features such as the Tranchot Obelisk, a Monopteros on the site of today's revolving tower, and a small Chinese pagoda. The circular path, beginning at the site of today's bronze statues, through the recently restored beech avenue on the north slope, offered spa guests and citizens different views of the city and the surrounding countryside, until all the views converged at the obelisk. The course itself was also dramatically designed by Weyhe, with flat sections alternating with climbs of varying lengths.

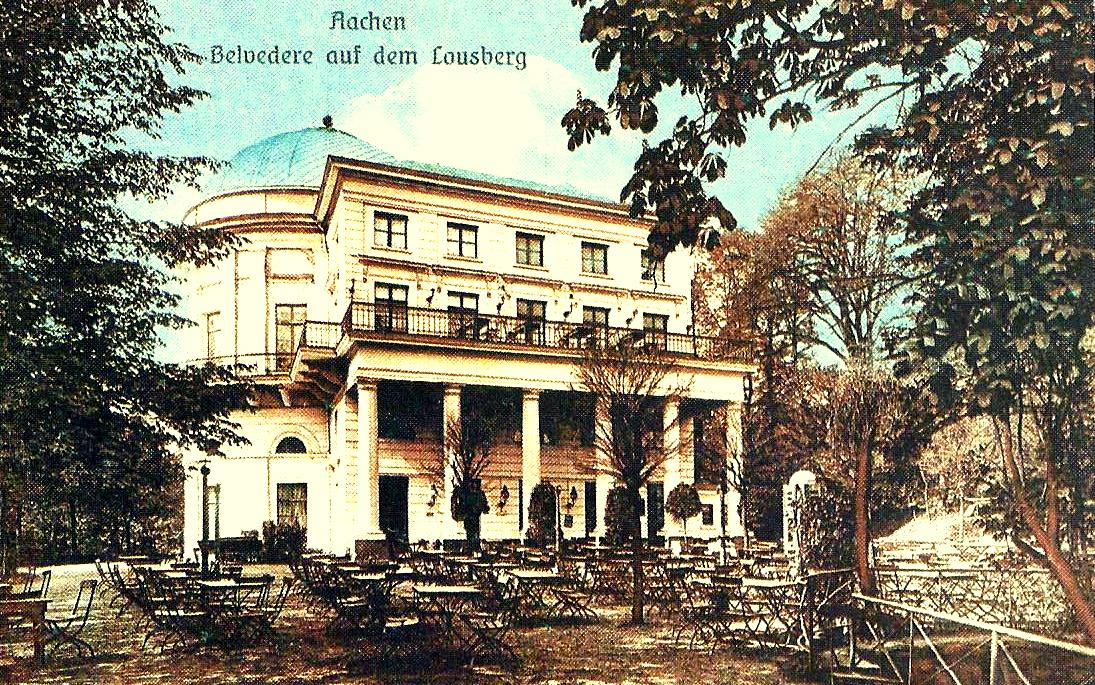
The excursion Restaurant "Belvedere" (1896) on the Lousberg

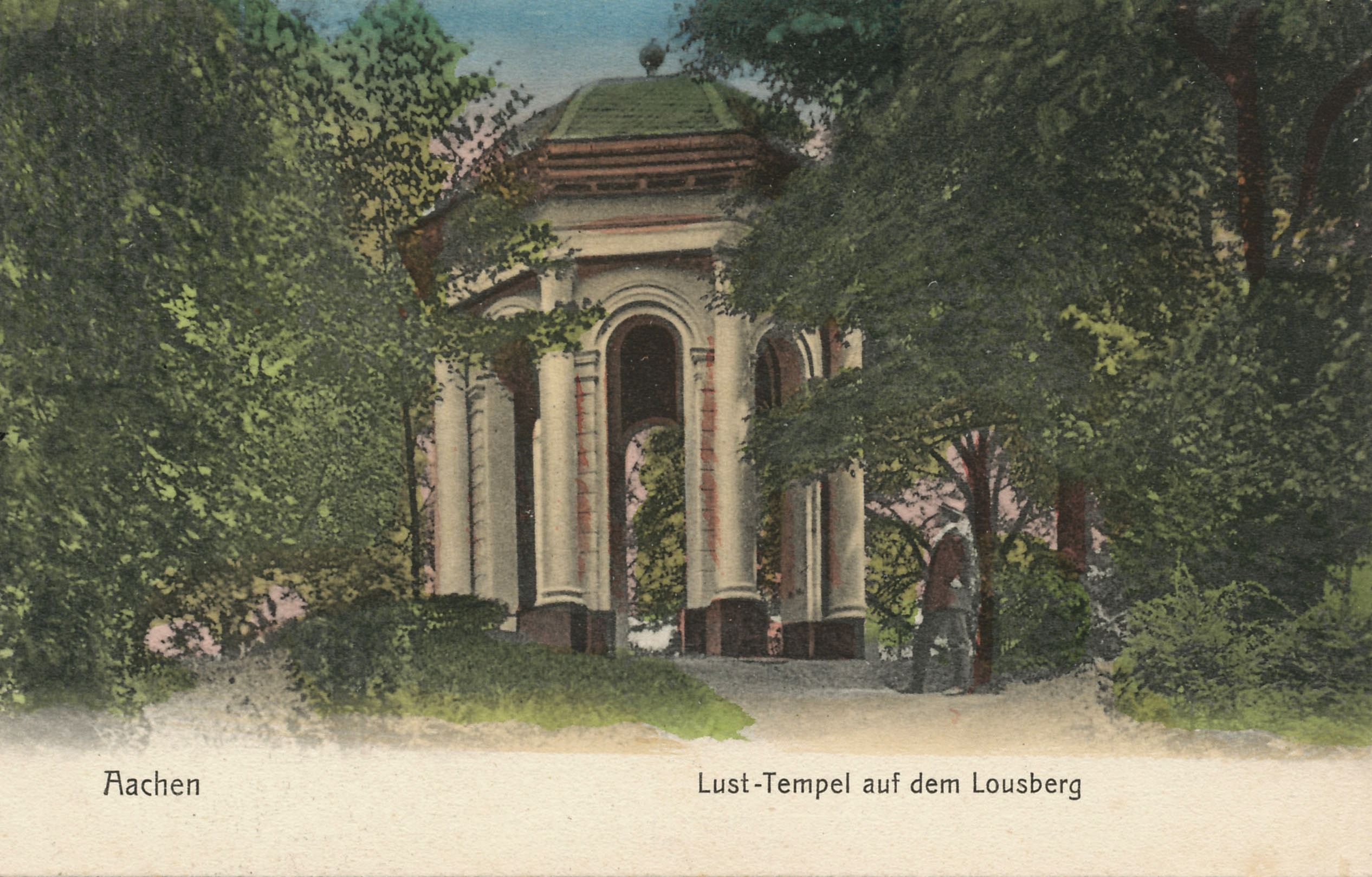
Temple of Pleasure (Monopteros) on the Lousberg

Between 1803 and 1814, General Secretary Johann Wilhelm Körfgen had his Müsch estate, located on the northern flank of the Lousberg in the Soers, transformed into a ferme ornée according to Maximilian Friedrich Weyhe's plans for the Lousberg. In 1866, Weyhe's son Joseph Clemens Weyhe developed the 11-hectare park into today's Müsch Park.

At the end of the 19th century, according to the plans of Aachen's director of gardens Heinrich Grube, the park areas of the Lousberg were extended eastwards to include the areas of the Salvatorberg, so that a network of green spaces could be created with the city fortifications (northern parts of the ring of avenues) planned by Maximilian Friedrich Weyhe from 1807 and with today's municipal gardens designed by Peter Joseph Lenné in 1852.

In 1906, the city of Aachen rebuilt the Kersten Pavilion, a baroque building designed by the Aachen architect Johann Joseph Couven, on the Lousberg. The pavilion, which is about 100 years older than the Lousberg Park, was previously located in the city of Aachen at Annuntiatenbach 22–28 and was part of the city palace of the wealthy dye-works owner Nicolaus Mantels. To save the building from demolition, the city bought it and had it rebuilt on the Lousberg. The pavilion has been managed by the Lousberg Society since 2005 and is used for exhibitions and lectures.

The open-air stage on the Lousberg, which was built like a Greek theater on the hillside facing the city, failed not least because of the Aachen weather.

During World War II, the Belvédère social house and other structures in the park were destroyed. The remains of the columns of the Belvédère can still be seen today and are colloquially known as the "Aachen Acropolis".

The Belvedere Water Tower was built in 1956 to provide water to the western neighborhoods. In the 1980s, however, more efficient pumps made this unnecessary, and in 1988 the tower ceased to function as a water tower altogether. After extensive renovations, it is now used primarily as an office building. For a long time, the top floor of the building housed a café. The café was known for its 360° panoramic view and the automatic movement of tables around the circular area using a slow conveyor belt. A restaurant has since opened in the same space.

Today, the Lousberg is largely wooded and serves as a local recreation area. The extensive park of the former St. Raphael Monastery north of the Lousberg was integrated into the Lousberg Park in 2009. The Lousberg is also the site of the annual summer Lousberg Run and the open-air literature festival "Reading Pleasure on the Lousberg".

Pictures

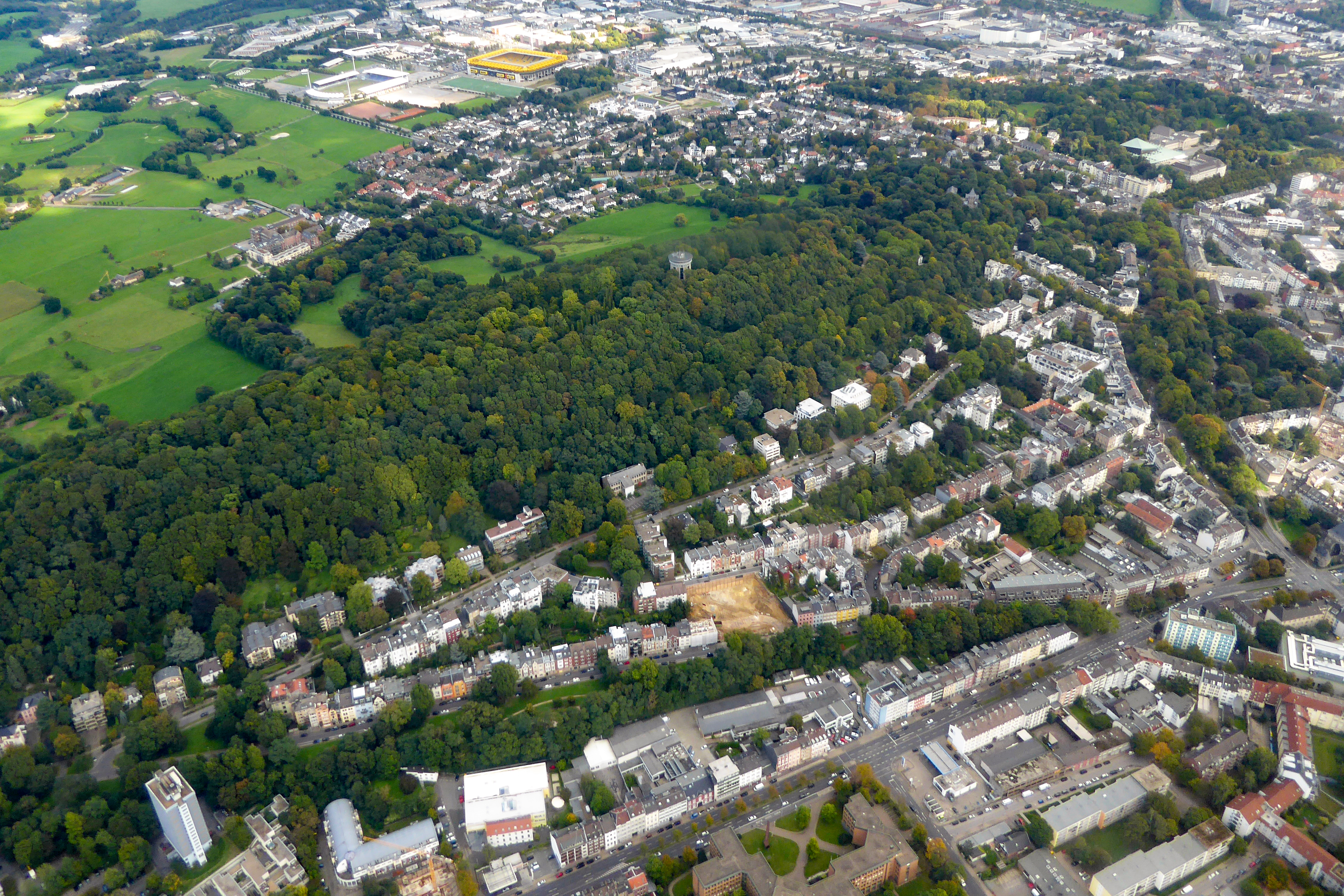
Aerial view of Lousberg in the north of Aachen

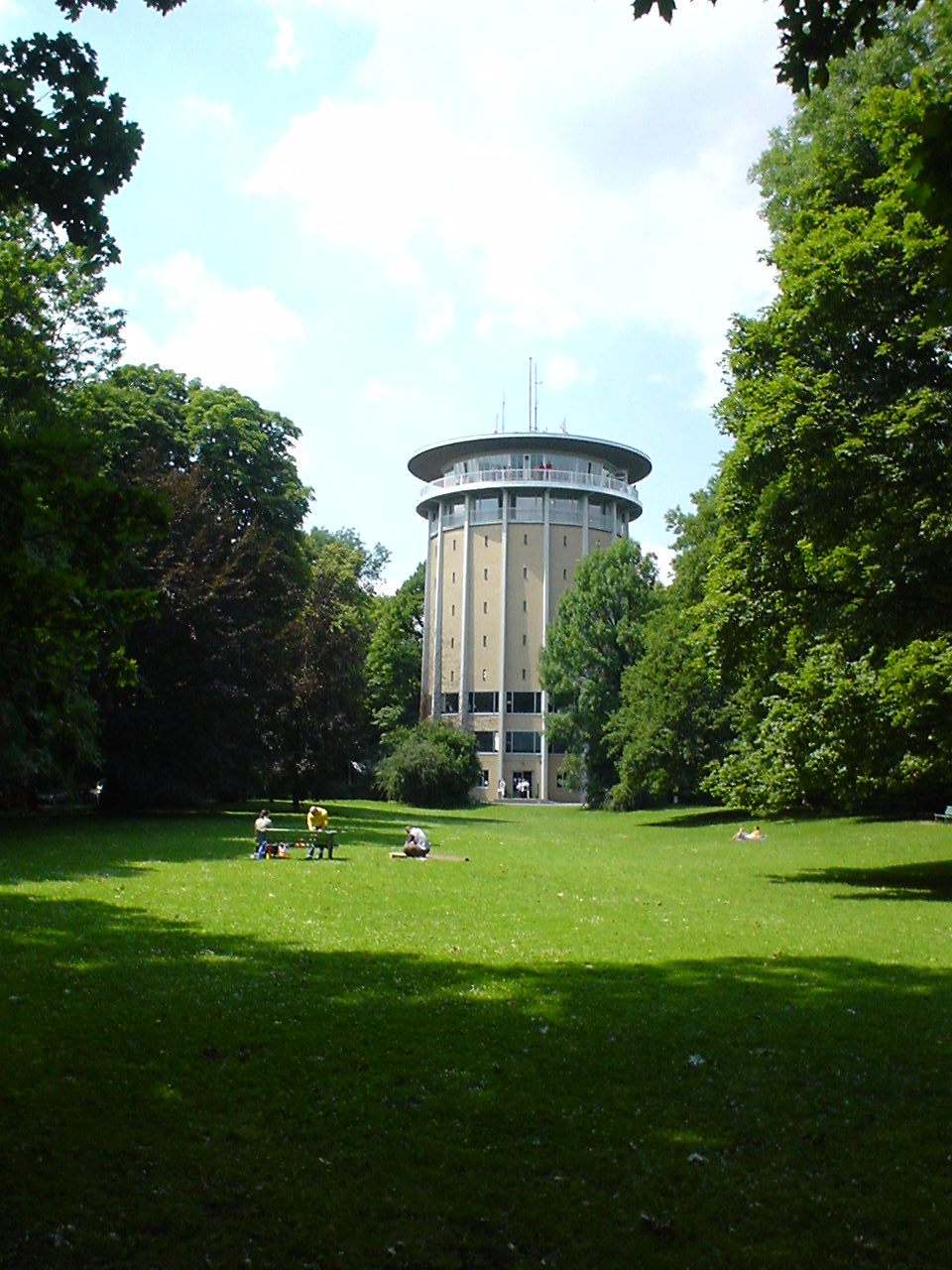
Belvedere water and observation tower

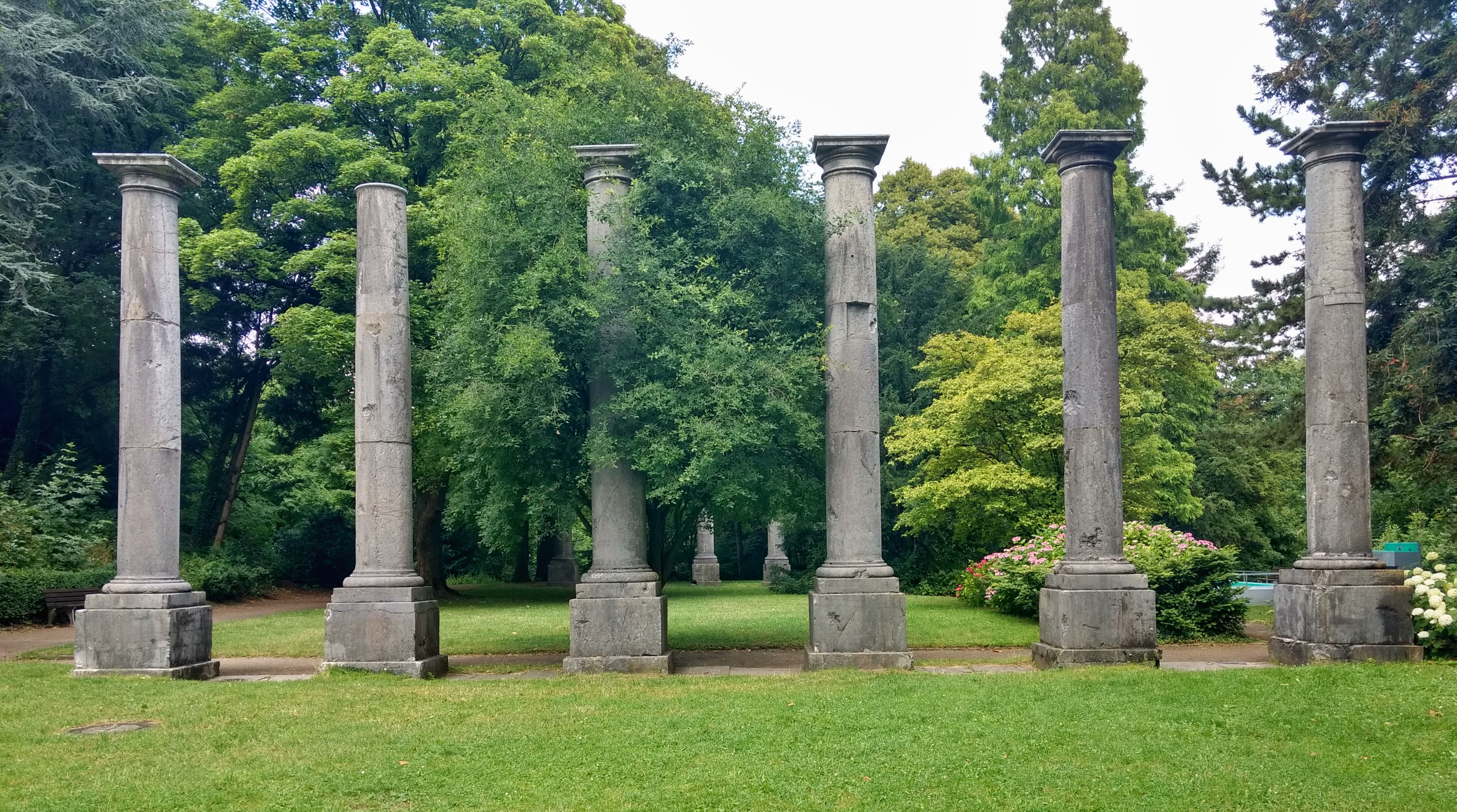
The columns of the former Belvedere Society House

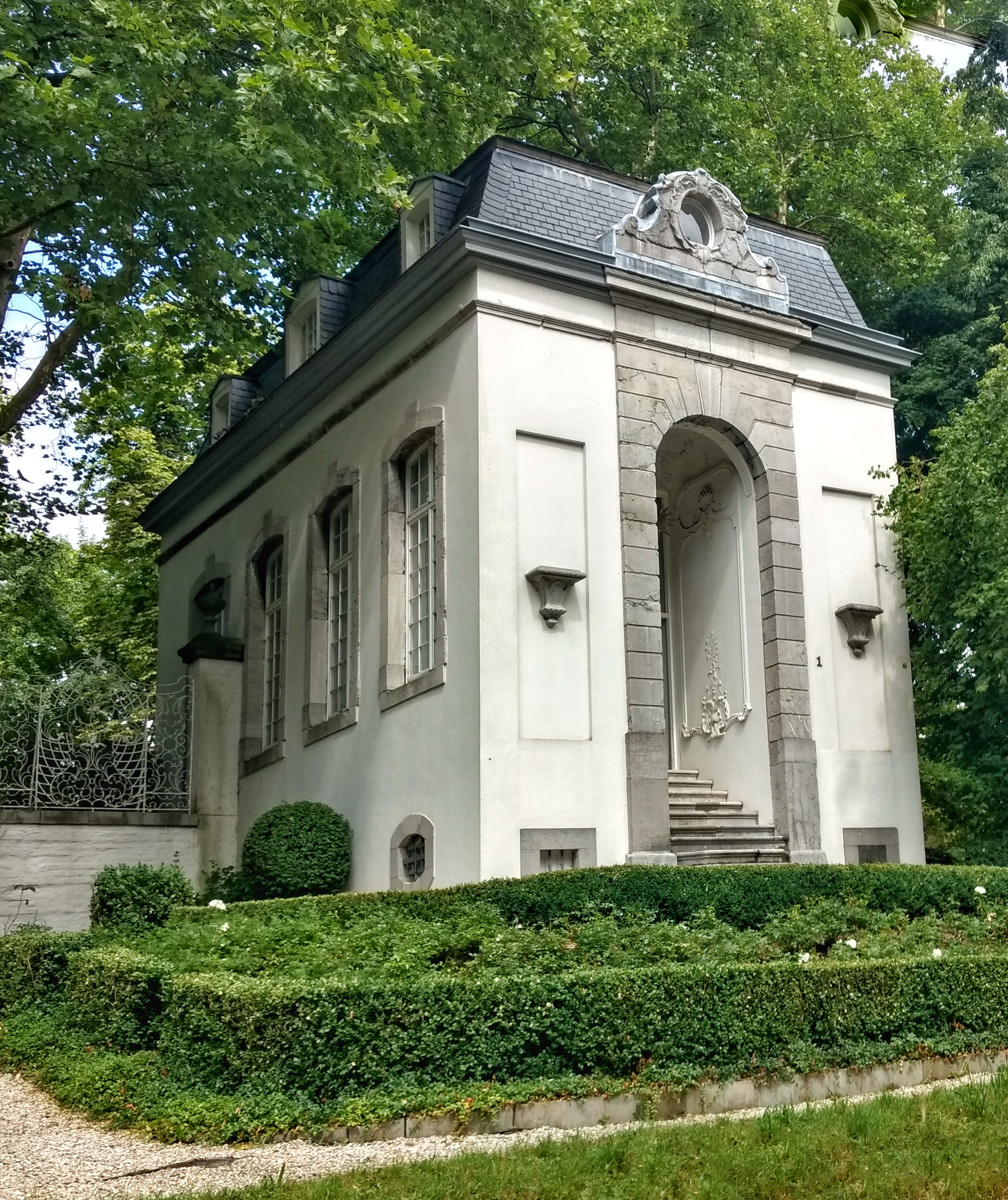
Kersten Pavilion

== Legend ==
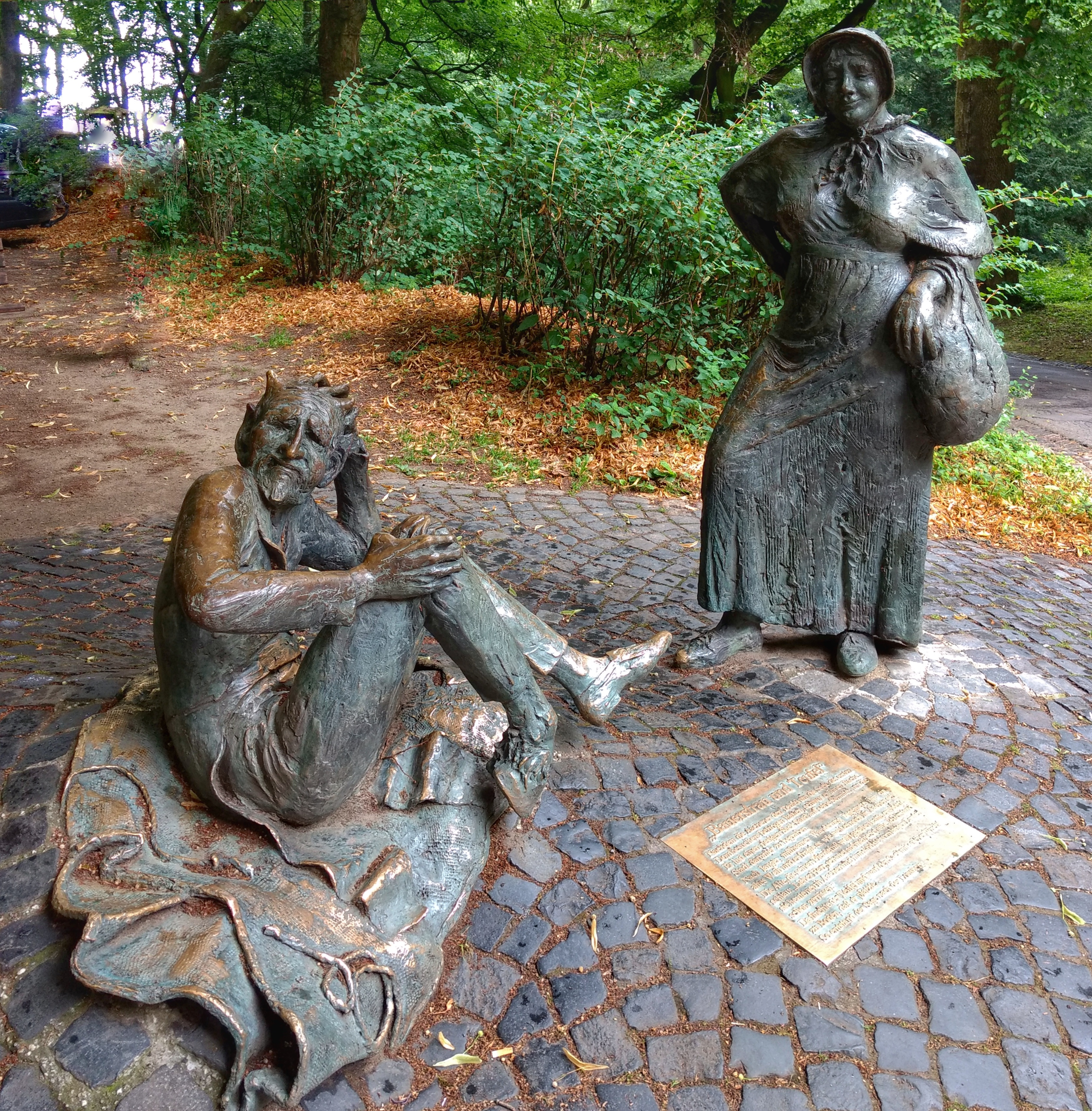
Bronze statues on the Lousberg

The Lousberg legend, one of the Aachen legends, explains the existence of the Lousberg as a single mountain in the middle of the Aachen basin in an etiological way.

According to the Aachen Cathedral legend, the people of Aachen tricked the devil into building the cathedral. The devil was out for revenge and wanted to bury the cathedral and the city in the sand forever. However, he was tricked by a poor woman and dropped the pile of sand north of the city, creating a larger and smaller mountain.

Because the woman was "lous", which means "clever" in the Aachen dialect, the larger mountain was called "Lousberg".

The legend is commemorated by a group of bronze statues on the Lousberg, depicting a farmer's wife and a devil, created in 1985 by Aachen artist Krista Löneke-Kemmerling.
