= Jason and Medea (disambiguation) =

Jason and Medea in the Argonautica of Apollonius of Rhodes

- Jason and Medea (painting), a 1907 painting by John William Waterhouse
- Jason et Médée (ballet) (1763)

== See also ==
- Argonautica
- Golden Fleece
- Perseus and Andromeda
- Saint George and the Dragon
- Medea (disambiguation)
