= Soers =

Coordinates: 50°47′36″N 6°5′50″E

- Interactive map of Soers

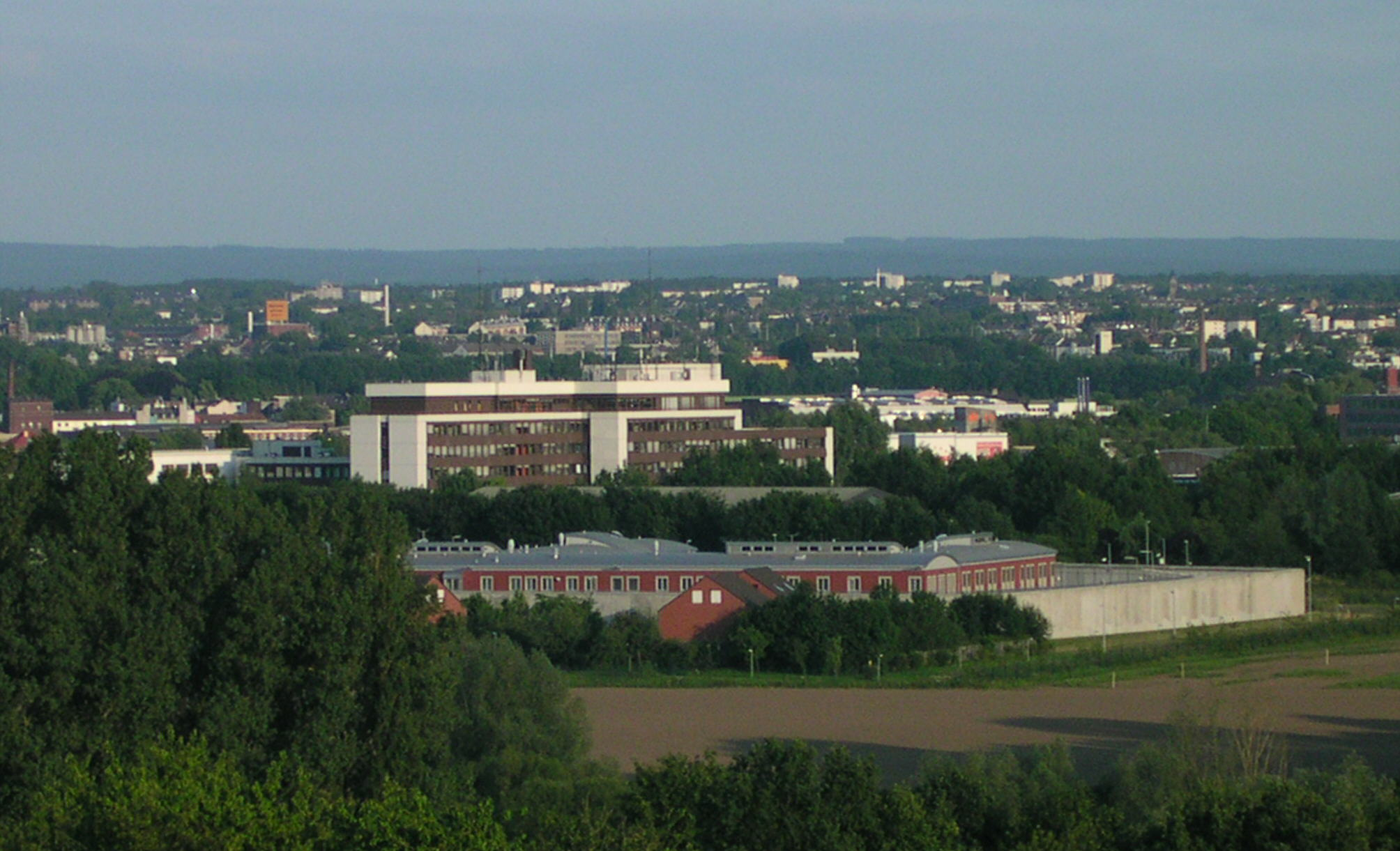
police headquarters and prison

Soers is a community within Aachen and part of the district of Aachen-Laurensberg. The predominantly rural district today stretches from the border of Aachen-Mitte, the central district of Aachen, past the slopes of the Lousberg, a hill in the north of the city. It is a wetland that is drained by several rivers. The Wurm drains out of the area's north end, and is the only drain of the Rur River in the Aachen Basin. Soers is known mainly as a result of the Old Tivoli, the former football stadium of Alemannia Aachen.

The area's largely undeveloped nature and its easy access to the A4 motorway has caused the community to become further developed in recent years. The police headquarters of Aachen were constructed there, as well as the Aachen Prison and Aachen's tax office.

== Sport Park Soers ==
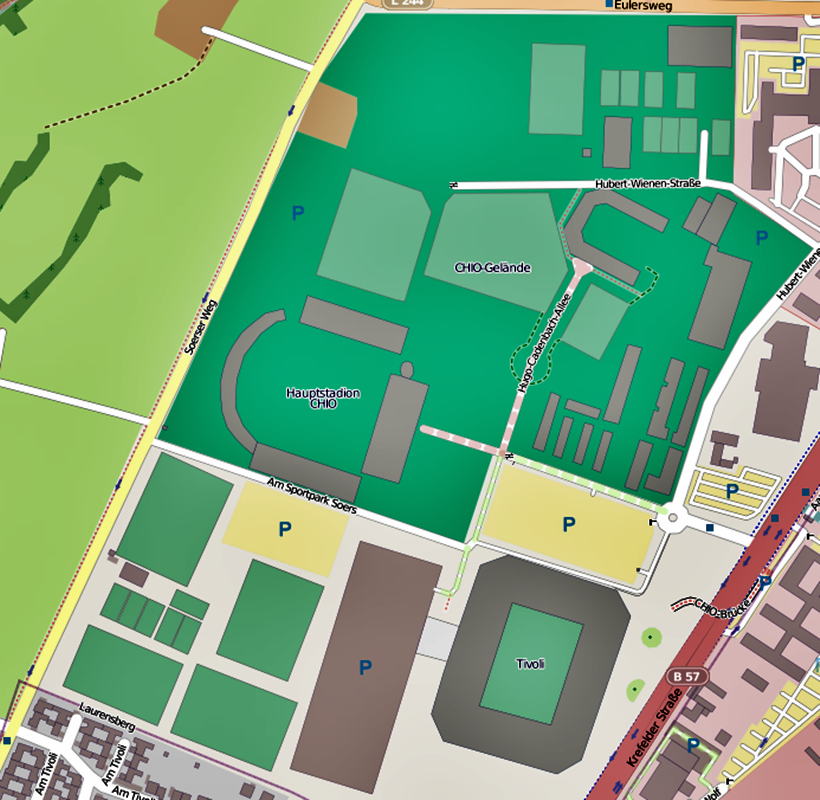
Sport Park Soers

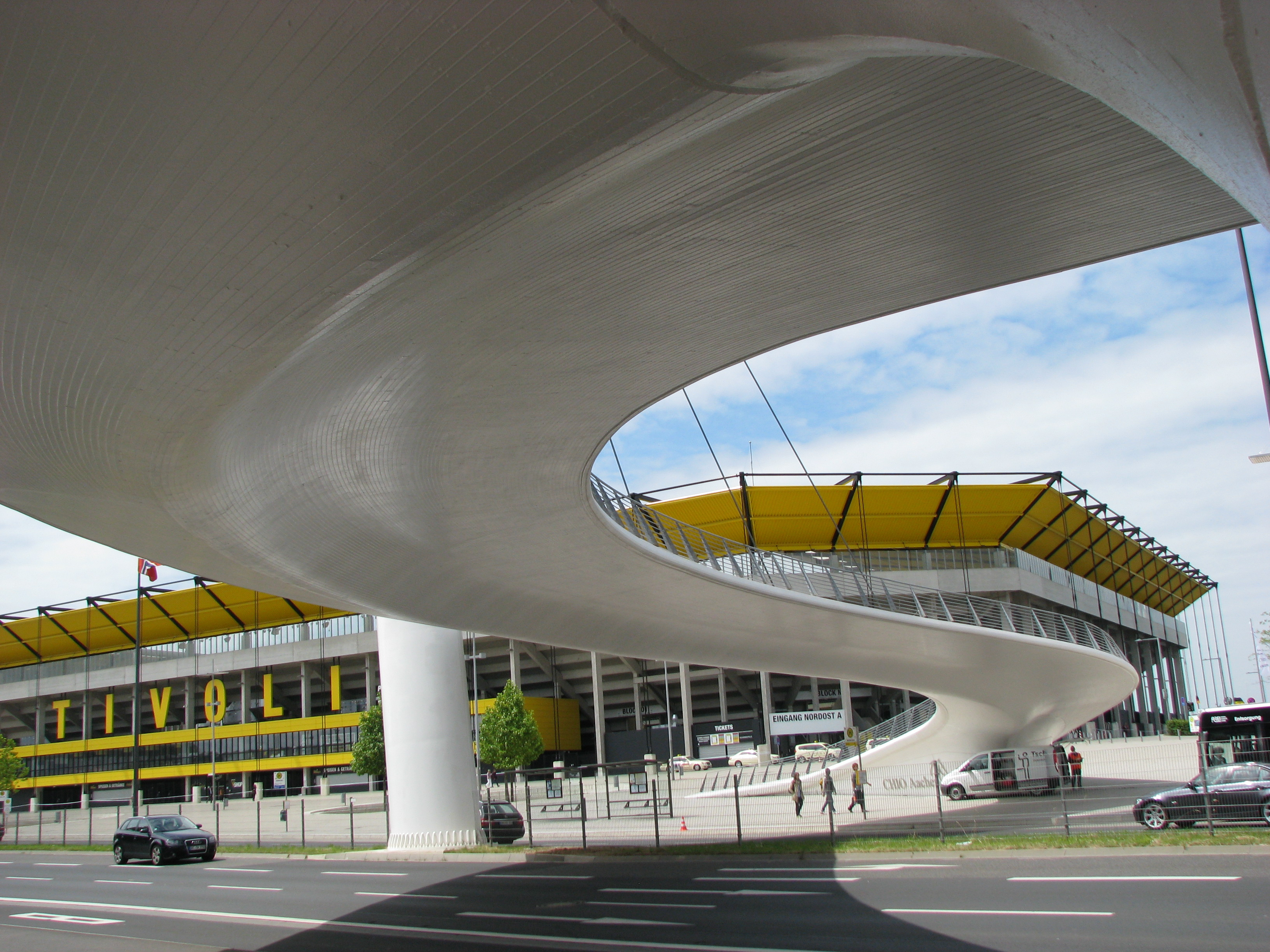
Bundesstraße 57 - CHIO pedestrian bridge

The city of Aachen, the Aachen-Laurensberg Riding Club (Rennverein), and Alemannia Aachen adopted an integrated event and site management for the Sports Park Soers. Much of the sports facilities, including parking and green areas, are shared. These facilities are located on highway 57 and are easily accessible via the A4 motorway, as well as by the bus lines 51 and 151. The public transit authority of Aachen (ASEAG) provides additional buses on event days.

The Sports Park Soers contains the following sports facilities and buildings:

- New Tivoli
- Hauptstadion (for equestrian events)
- Deutsche Bank Stadion
- Albert-Vahle-Halle
- Ice Rink
- Training courses
- Parking
- CHIO pedestrian bridge
