= Belvedere Water Tower =

Water tower in Aachen, Germany

Coordinates: 50°47′12″N 6°04′50″E

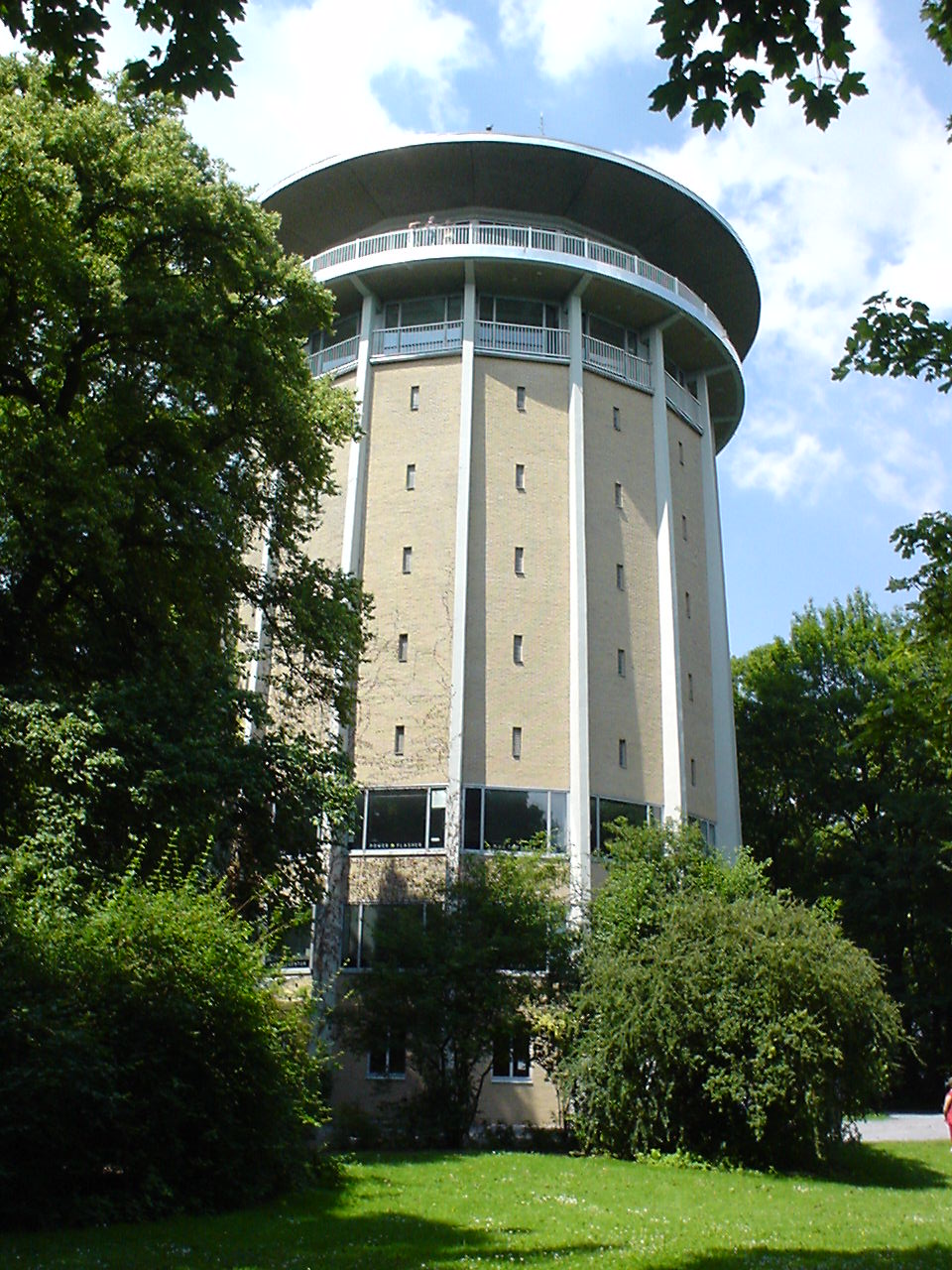
Water Tower Belvedere

The Water Tower Belvedere is a water tower of reinforced concrete construction in Aachen, Germany, located on the Lousberg hill.

It was built from 1956 to 1958 according to the plans of architect Wilhelm Fischer, who was also the city planning inspector at the time.

The water tower accommodates a revolving restaurant, which reopened in 2005 after being closed for several years (it closed again for one year, but was reopened again in 2012). The restaurant revolves once every 56 minutes. Service includes a restaurant, a beer garden, and a traditional Sunday brunch.

== See also ==
- List of towers
