= Median (disambiguation) =

Median may refer to:

== Mathematics and statistics ==
- Median (statistics), in statistics, a number that separates the lowest- and highest-value halves
- Median (geometry), in geometry, a line joining a vertex of a triangle to the midpoint of the opposite side
- Median (graph theory), a vertex m(a,b,c) that belongs to shortest paths between each pair of a, b, and c
- Median algebra, an algebraic triple product generalising the algebraic properties of the majority function
- Median graph, undirected graph in which every three vertices a, b, and c have a unique median
- Geometric median, a point minimizing the sum of distances to a given set of points

== People ==
- Median (rapper), a rapper from the U.S. city of Raleigh, North Carolina

== Science and technology ==
- Median (biology), an anatomical term of location, meaning at or towards the central plane of a bilaterally symmetrical organism or structure
- Median filter, a nonlinear digital filtering technique used to reduce noise in images
- Median nerve, a nerve in humans and other animals located in the upper limb, one of the five main nerves originating from the brachial plexus

== Other ==
- Median language, the extinct Northwestern Iranian language of the Medes people
- Median Empire or Median Kingdom, an ancient Iranian empire predating the First Persian Empire
- Median consonant, a consonant sound that is produced when air flows across the center of the mouth over the tongue
- Median strip, the portion of a divided roadway used to separate opposing traffic; the British equivalent is central reservation
- Median triangle, an archaeological term referring to the area bounded by Hamadān, Malāyer and Kangāvar in Iran
- Median Day, a mid-Lenten observance in the Armenian Apostolic Church, marking the midpoint of Great Lent.

== See also ==
- Medes, an ancient Iranian people who originated in Media, in the northwest of present-day Iran
- Mediant, in music, the note halfway between the tonic and the dominant
- Mediant (mathematics), a fraction created from the sums of the numerators and denominators of two other fractions
- Medial (disambiguation)
- Medium (disambiguation)
- Medina (disambiguation)
