= Medial wall =

Medial wall may refer to:

- Nasal septum, in the nose
- Labyrinthine wall of tympanic cavity, in the ear
