= Medium (band) =

American rock band from Minneapolis, Minnesota

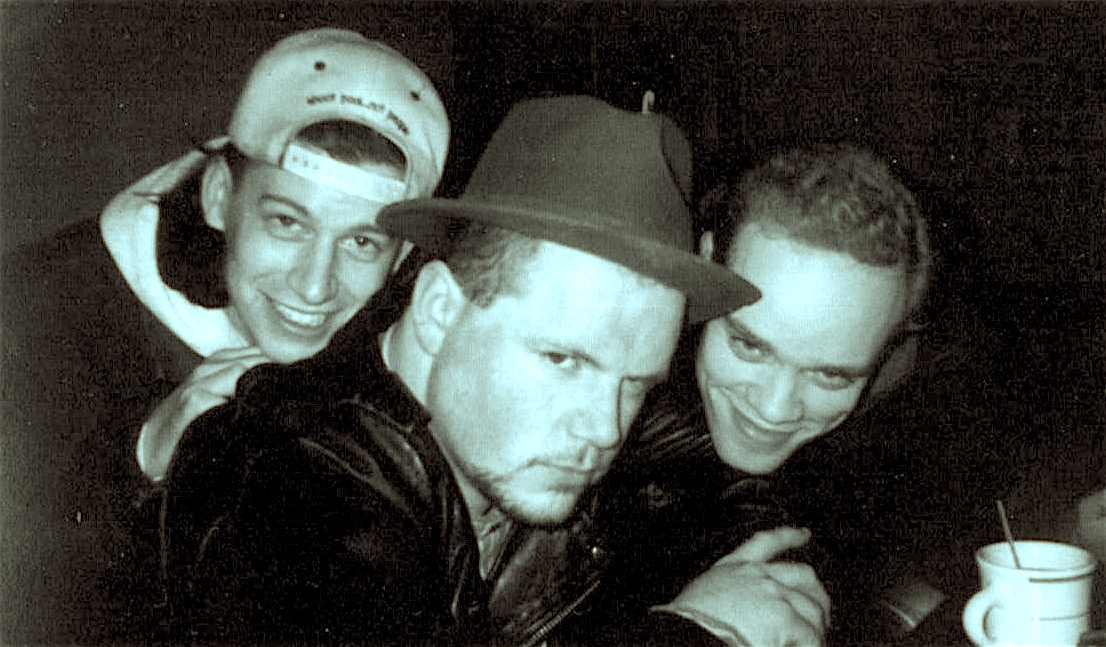
- Medium (from left: Mishler, McKnight, McDonald c. 1995)

Background information
- Origin: Minneapolis, Minnesota, United States
- Genres: Alternative rock, post-grunge, hard rock
- Years active: 1992–1998, 2016–present
- Labels: Crowdaddy Music, Oarfin Records
- Members: Bryan McDonald (guitar and vocals) Justin Mishler (bass) Erik McKnight (drums) Daniel Lange (Keyboards)
- Website: http://www.medium.band

Medium is an American rock band from Minneapolis, Minnesota composed of Bryan McDonald (guitar/vocals), Justin Mishler (bass), Erik McKnight (drums), and Daniel Lange (Keyboards). Between 1992 and 1998, Medium released two studio albums; Extensions Of The Skin, and The Mechanical Bride, before becoming inactive in 1998. In July 2016, Medium announced that they would be reuniting.

== Extensions of the Skin ==
After recording the largely self produced Extensions of the Skin album in 1992 McDonald recruited musicians Justin Mishler on bass and Eric McKnight on drums to support the album for live performances. The differing influences and backgrounds of the musicians changed the sound of the Medium project from its folk/blues origin to a “More driven and dynamic” effort. Medium continued to tour reworking the source material while writing new songs. According to McDonald, "I loved that our odd combination of musical influences brought together a sound that allowed us to play with acts as contrasting as Fishbone, Rollins Band and The Wallflowers." The band built a sizable following, particularly in the Mid-West. Keyboardist Daniel Lange joined the project during the recording of The Mechanical Bride album.

== The Mechanical Bride ==
Medium began recording the second studio album The Mechanical Bride at Oarfin studios in Minneapolis, Minnesota late 1996 produced by Prince and the Revolution drummer Bobby Z. and engineer Dave Streeby. Three tracks, "Suburban Grey", "Blood Becomes Power" and "Swimming Past The Fourth Of July" were completed in these recording sessions. The remaining 13 tracks were recorded at Skinner Box Studio produced by McDonald with engineering by Larry Chapin. The album was released on March 28, 1997. Tracks from The Mechanical Bride (notably "Wedding Photo", "Swimming Past The Fourth of July" and "Ten Feet of Rope") were played at regular and heavy rotation on alternative radio stations thorough the mid-west and north-east of the United States.

== Farewell ==
A farewell show was performed on November 20, 1998. Medium members progressed to solo efforts and new projects, the band as a whole was generally considered to be broken up and not expected to produce new material.

== Reunion ==
Members of Medium have announced that they would be reuniting with no specifics as of July 2016.

== Discography ==
- Extensions of the Skin (1995)
- The Mechanical Bride (1997)
- Medium Live: Who Wants to be Mayor (1998)

== Members ==
- Bryan McDonald (guitar and vocals)
- Justin Mishler (bass)
- Erik McKnight (drums)
- Daniel Lange (Keyboards)
