= Statue of Medea =

- Artist: Davit Khmaladze
- Year: 2007
- Medium: Bronze
- Subject: Medea
- Dimensions: 130 cm (51 in)
- Location: Batumi
- Coordinates: 41°39′04″N 41°38′13″E
- Website: GoBatumi.com

The Statue of Medea (Georgian: მედეას ძეგლი) is a monumental sculpture located at Europe Square in Batumi, Georgia. Designed by Georgian architect and sculptor Davit Khmaladze, the statue depicts the mythological figure Medea, a princess of ancient Colchis, holding the Golden Fleece. It was unveiled on 6 July 2007 by the President of Georgia, Mikheil Saakashvili, as part of a wider program to promote Batumi as a Black Sea tourist destination. The monument has since become one of the city's most recognizable landmarks and a symbol of Georgia’s link to classical mythology and the legend of the Argonauts.

== History ==
The decision to erect a monument to Medea in Batumi was part of a broader program by the Georgian government in the early 2000s to modernize the city and promote it as a major Black Sea tourist destination. The statue was designed by Georgian architect and sculptor Davit Khmaladze, who portrayed Medea holding the Golden Fleece, a direct reference to the ancient Greek myth that associates Colchis (present-day western Georgia) with the legend of the Argonauts.

The statue was officially unveiled on 6 July 2007 by the President of Georgia, Mikheil Saakashvili, in a ceremony attended by local and national officials. At the time of its inauguration, the government emphasized the monument as a symbol of Georgia’s cultural heritage and its historical ties to European civilization.

== See also ==
- Colchis
- History of Georgia (country)
- Golden Fleece
- Medea
- Argonauts
