= Medea (Artemisia Gentileschi) =

Painting by Artemisia Gentileschi

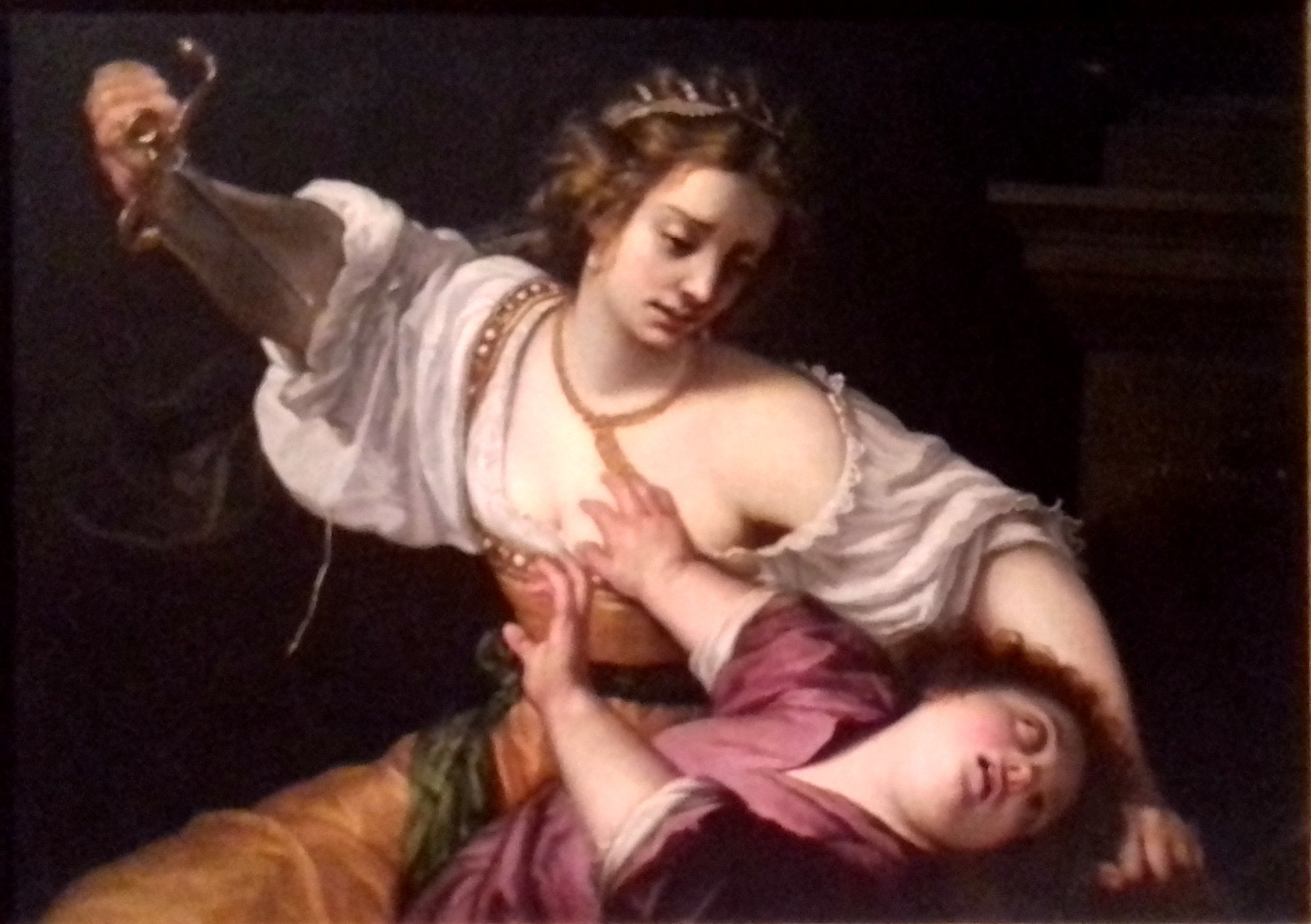
Artemisia Gentileschi, Medea, 1620s, unknown location

Medea is an oil painting by the Italian baroque painter Artemisia Gentileschi. Medea was a figure from Greek mythology. In the Gentileschi painting Medea is depicted at the moment she kills her son.

The location and the dimensions of the painting are unknown. The painting has been approximately dated to the 1620s, probably the late 1620s when Gentileschi was working in Venice. The work was exhibited for the first time as a Gentileschi in the 2017 "Artemisia Gentileschi e il suo tempo" exhibition in Rome.

== See also ==
- List of works by Artemisia Gentileschi
