= Medio (company) =

Mobile analytics provider

- Type: Acquired
- Industry: Mobile analytics and big data
- Founded: Seattle (2004)
- Key people: Brian Lent (Founder) Rob Lilleness (CEO)
- Website: Medio.com

Medio is a business-to-business mobile web analytics provider based in Seattle, Washington. The company processes pre-existing data to provide historic and predictive analytics. Medio is built on a cloud-based Hadoop platform and is designed to interpret big data for mobile enterprise. Medio has had partners including: IBM, Rovio, Verizon, T-Mobile, ABC, and Disney.

Medio was founded in 2004 by Brian Lent, Bill Bryant, David Bluhm, and Michael Libes and employed 40 people. Founded to be the 'Google' of mobile search engines, Medio was backed by $30 million in initial venture funding from companies including: Accel Partners, Mohr Davidow Ventures, and Frazier Technology Ventures.

Medio received $11 million more in 2006 to create a mobile analytics search engine capable of searching for ringtones, graphics, and internet-delivered information. This sparked employment to over 100 employees for some time, but in 2009 Google released their new mobile search engine. Rob Lilleness, who joined the company as President and COO in 2007 and was subsequently named CEO in 2009, took that as an opportunity to refocus as a predictive analytics and data science provider, using their recommendations engine as a key component of their newly focused company. The shift resulted in lay-offs of much of the staff, scaling back to nearly 60 employees.

By the end of 2010, the company became profitable, nearly tripling its sales from previous years. Medio grew to 70 employees with a total of $44 million in venture funding.

On July 1, 2014, Medio was acquired by Nokia.
