= Medea (name) =

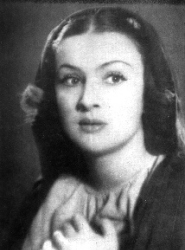
Medea Japaridze

Medea or Medéa is a female given name. From the Greek Μήδεια Mēdeia, possibly meaning someone who is pondering or cunning. In Greek mythology Medea was a sorceress from Colchis who helped Jason gain the Golden Fleece. They were married, but eventually Jason left her for another woman. For revenge Medea slew Jason's new lover and also had her own children by Jason killed. Georgian popular tradition attributes the origins of the term Medicine to Medea's name

== Name Days ==
- Czech: 4 September
- Hungarian: 4 September

== Famous bearers ==
- Amadea Palaiologina of Montferrat (1418–1440), queen consort of Cyprus
- Medea Chakhava (1921–2009), Georgian actress
- Medea, is a princess from Colchis (Western Georgia) in Greek mythology
- Medea Amiranashvili (1930–2023), Georgian opera singer and film actress.
- Medea Japaridze (1923–1994), Georgian actress
- Medea Benjamin (b. 1952), American peace activist
