= Medial plantar =

Medial plantar may refer to:

- Medial plantar nerve
- Medial plantar artery
