= Medial border =

Medial border may refer to:

- Medial border of scapula
- Medial border of kidney, the side of the kidney where the renal hilum is located
