= Laurensberg =

- Borough of Aachen
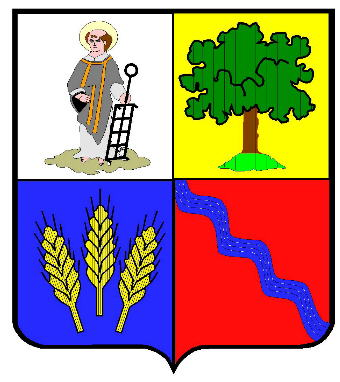
- Coat of arms
- Interactive map of Laurensberg
- Location within Germany Location within North Rhine-Westphalia
- Coordinates: 50°47′50″N 6°3′46″E
- Country: Germany
- State: North Rhine-Westphalia
- City: Aachen

Area
  - Total: 29.97 km^{2} (11.57 sq mi)
- Elevation: 163 m (535 ft)

Population (2020-12-31)
  - Total: 20,381
  - Density: 680.0/km^{2} (1,761/sq mi)
- Time zone: UTC+01:00 (CET)
  - Summer (DST): UTC+02:00 (CEST)
- Postal codes: 52074 / 52072
- Dialling codes: 0241

Laurensberg is a quarter (Stadtteil) and borough (Stadtbezirk) of Aachen, Germany.

As a borough, Laurensberg includes, in addition to Laurensberg itself, Orsbach, Seffent, Soers, Vaalserquartier and Vetschau, as well as the residential areas of Gut Kullen and Steppenberg. Laurensberg is the largest district of Aachen by area.

The borough borders other Aachen city boroughs Haaren, Aachen-Mitte and Richterich and the German communities of Kohlscheid (which is part of Herzogenrath) und Würselen (both of which belong to the district of Aachen, which is distinct from the city). Beyond the German border, the borough borders the Belgian town of Kelmis, in the Province of Liège, as well as the Dutch communities of Vaals, Gulpen-Wittem and Simpelveld, all contained with the Dutch Province of Limburg.

The borough Laurensberg covers 2,997 hectares and has 20,381 inhabitants (as of 2020).

The borough is characterized by its wide hilltop views and its interesting (from an art history perspective) St. Laurentius Catholic Church. A highlight of the old town center is the large park surrounding the Schloss Rahe, the former residence and water fortress of a patrician Aachen-area family, which was refashioned in the 18th century by the businessman Gerhard Heusch into a stately four-wing castle.

Laurensberg is not to be confused with the former town of Laurenzberg, the remnants of which were absorbed by Eschweiler in the 1970s.

Laurensberg is also home to the Rugby Club RC Aachen, a major competitor in the 2. Rugby-Bundesliga.

== History ==
On a hill near the church, the site of an ancient Roman era sanctuary, evidenced by the presence of four “god stones”, can be found. Several Roman manors have been found in the area.

During the Carolingian dynasty, the St. Laurentius church was erected on a hill in Laurensberg. It is mentioned in writing from 17 October 870, in a document from Louis the German giving the church, which was then known as ad antiquum campum, or “Church at the old field”, to the abbey at Prüm.

In 896 Zwentibold, then King of Lotharingia, gave the surrounding area to his relative, the Abbess Gisela von Nivelles, who was the daughter of Lothair II, the previous king. Later the church failed and was returned, along with the surrounding lands, back to the kingdom and Engelbert II of Berg, Archbishop of Cologne.

The first recorded message of the place name St. Laurentii Bergh is from 1218, when the archbishop gave the area to the Church of Mary, which was a predecessor of the Aachen Cathedral and of which the Archbishop had previously been a provost. Laurensberg was already by this time home to an extensive church parish, which included the communities of Orsbach, Seffent, Laurensberg, Vetschau and Soers, as well as Richterich, Scheid, Horbach and Steinstraß.

By the 18th century, however, Laurensberg was no longer an independent community, but rather belonged to the Free Imperial City of Aachen, in which it made up a district within the County of Pont.

Being on the border between France and Germany, the area has seen numerous conflicts, such as during the French Revolution and the rise of Napoleon. It was not until 1797, when the entire left bank of the Rhine River was ceded to France that conflicts in the area died down.

During this time, Laurensberg was administered under the French Mairie system, until the fall of Napoleon, after which Laurensberg belonged to Rhine Province, and thus to the Kingdom of Prussia.

Later, during both World War I and World War II, Laurensberg escaped the kind of destruction seen by other nearby towns, though many people from the area were either killed in the wars, or went missing.

As part of the restructuring of the communities surrounding Aachen, Laurensberg was incorporated into Aachen on 1 January 1972. In the decades following Aachen’s annexation of Laurensberg, the population of the community has drastically increased, growing from 9,978 residents in 1970 to 20,436 by the end of 1995. This is largely due to the communities location relative to RWTH Aachen University, a major research and engineering university, and the Klinikum Aachen, which is the largest single-building hospital in Europe.

In Soers, a community in the east of Laurensberg District, the international horse show CHIO Aachen is held every summer.

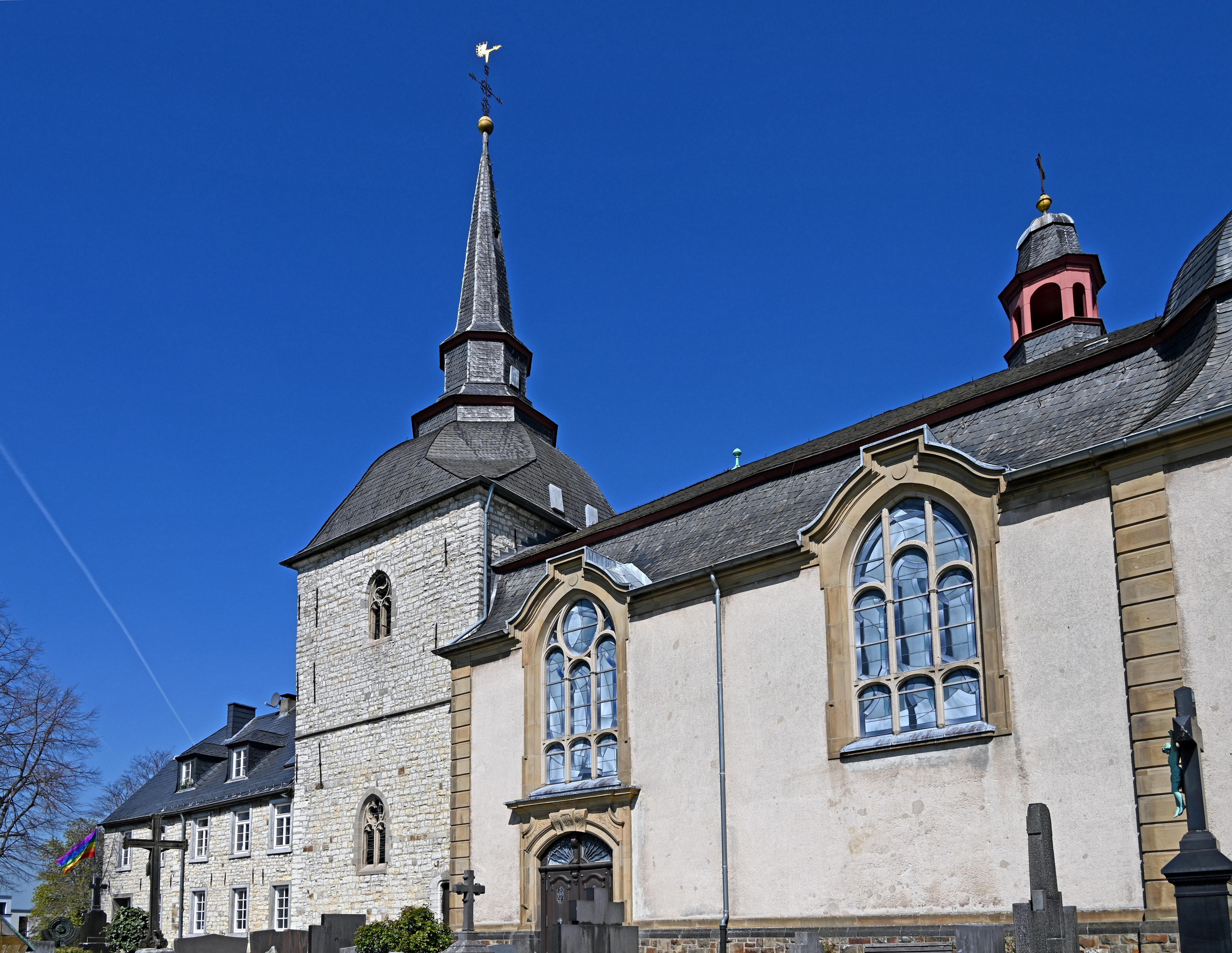
St. Laurentius, Laurensberg

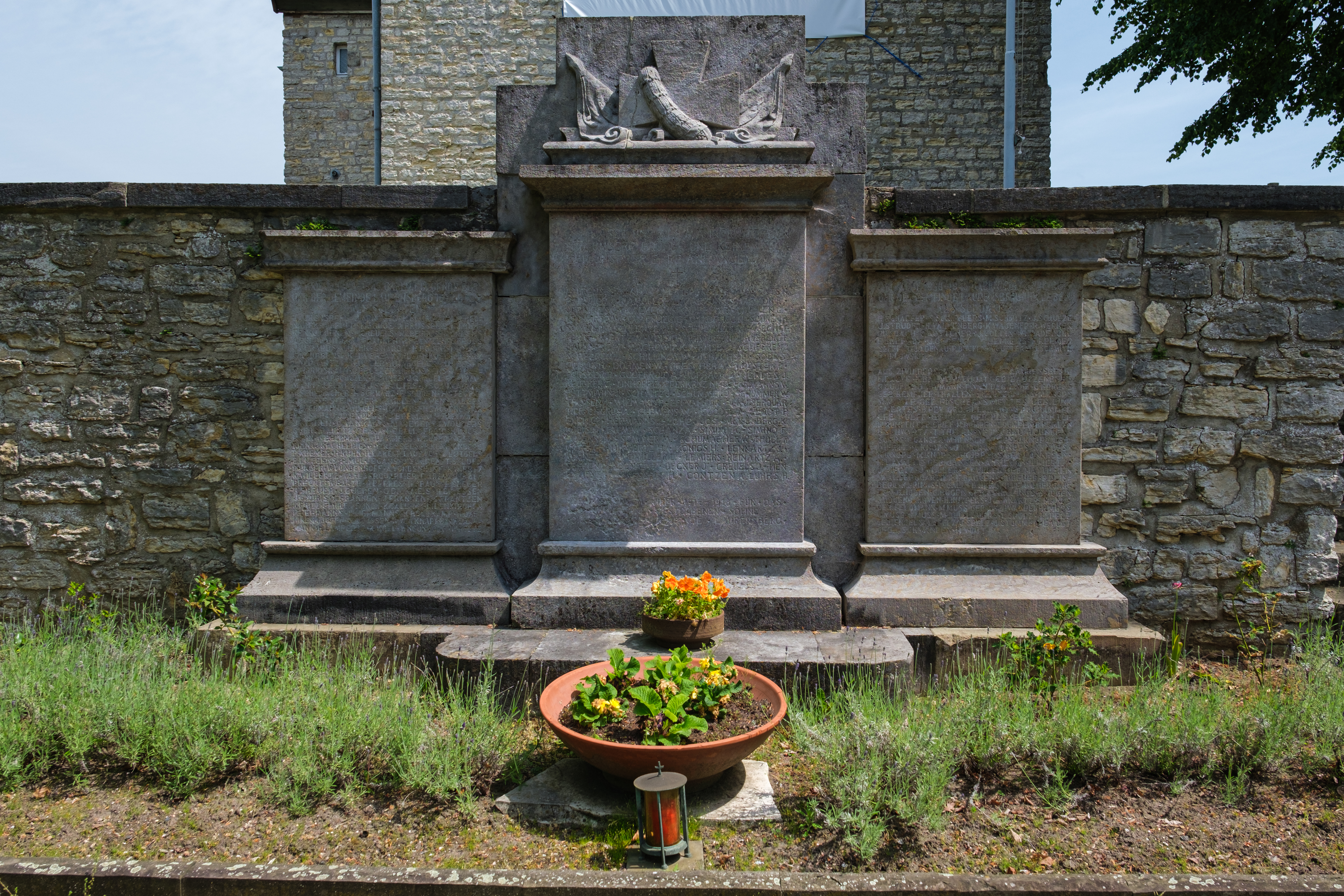
Memorial to the fallen in the two world wars, near the Laurentius church

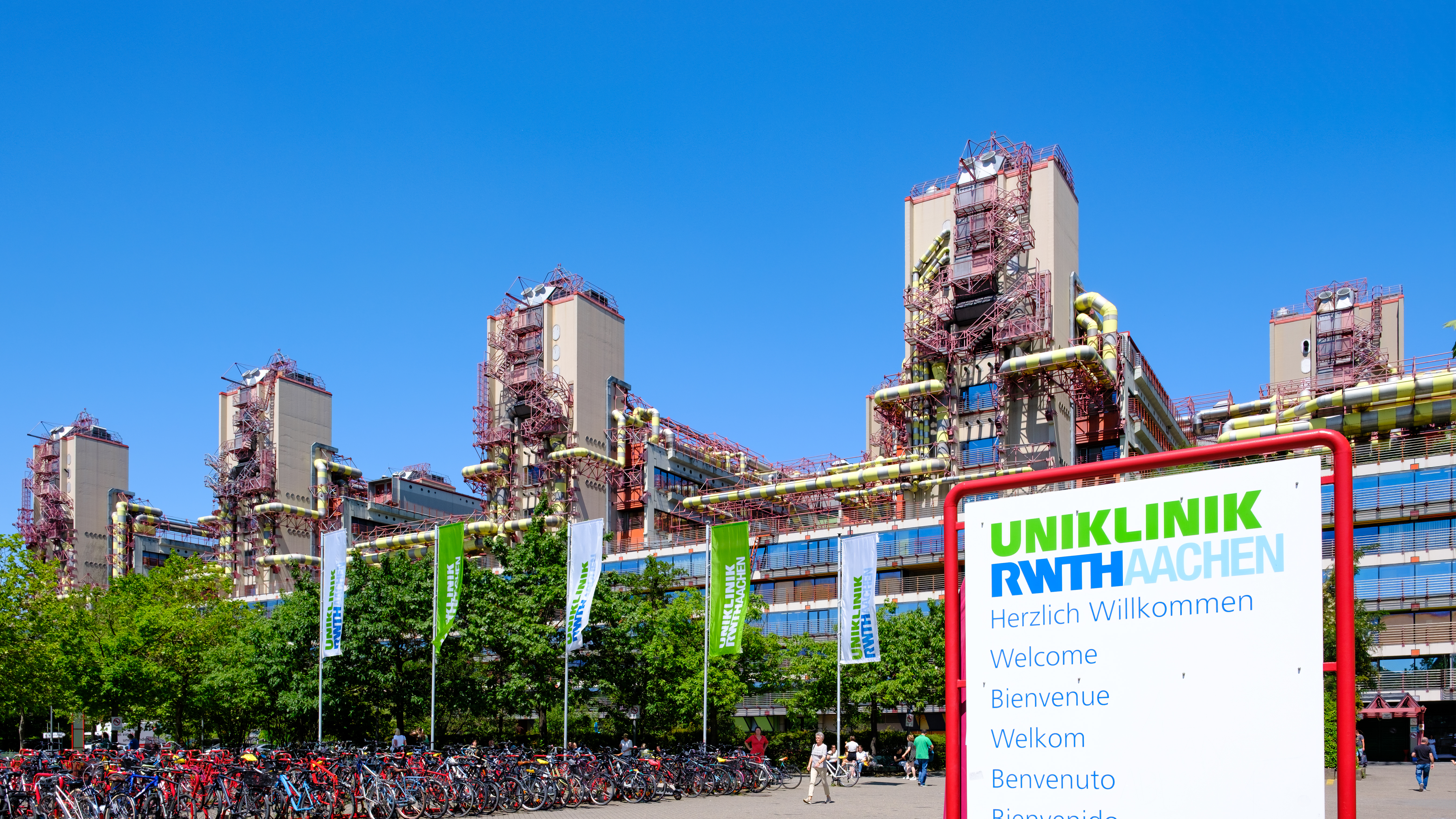
The Klinikum Aachen, the largest single-building hospital in Europe
