= Medial ligament =

Medial ligament might refer to:

- Medial arcuate ligament, in one's diaphragm
- Medial collateral ligament, one of the four major ligaments of the knee
- Medial palpebral ligament, near one's nose
- Medial pubovesical ligament, from one's bladder to one's pubis bones
- Medial talocalcaneal ligament, near one's ankle
- Medial umbilical ligament, near an abdominal wall
