= SS Medea =

A number of steamships were named Medea, including:

- SS Medea (1916), a Dutch cargo ship torpedoed and sunk in 1942
- SS Medea (1944), a French coastal tanker in service 1946–51
