= Media (automobile company) =

Defunct American motor vehicle manufacturer

Media was an American electric automobile built in 1899 and 1900 in Media, Pennsylvania.

== History ==
Media Carriage Works, was established in 1895 for built to order electric runabouts in 1899. The company decided to enter series production and made arrangements with the Pullen Battery & Electrical Manufacturing Company of Philadelphia.

The Pullen battery was used in the Media, a 900-pound runabout. Media offered versions of this vehicle for sale at $1,100 (equivalent to $42,570 in 2025) in 1900. The Media had a running range of thirty-five miles on a single charge and a top speed of 12 mph . Media Carriage Works may have built occasional Media's after 1900, but returned to the carriage trade.
