= Elisabethhalle =

Art Nouveau indoor swimming pool in Aachen, Germany

Coordinates: 50°46′24.24″N 6°5′7.58″E

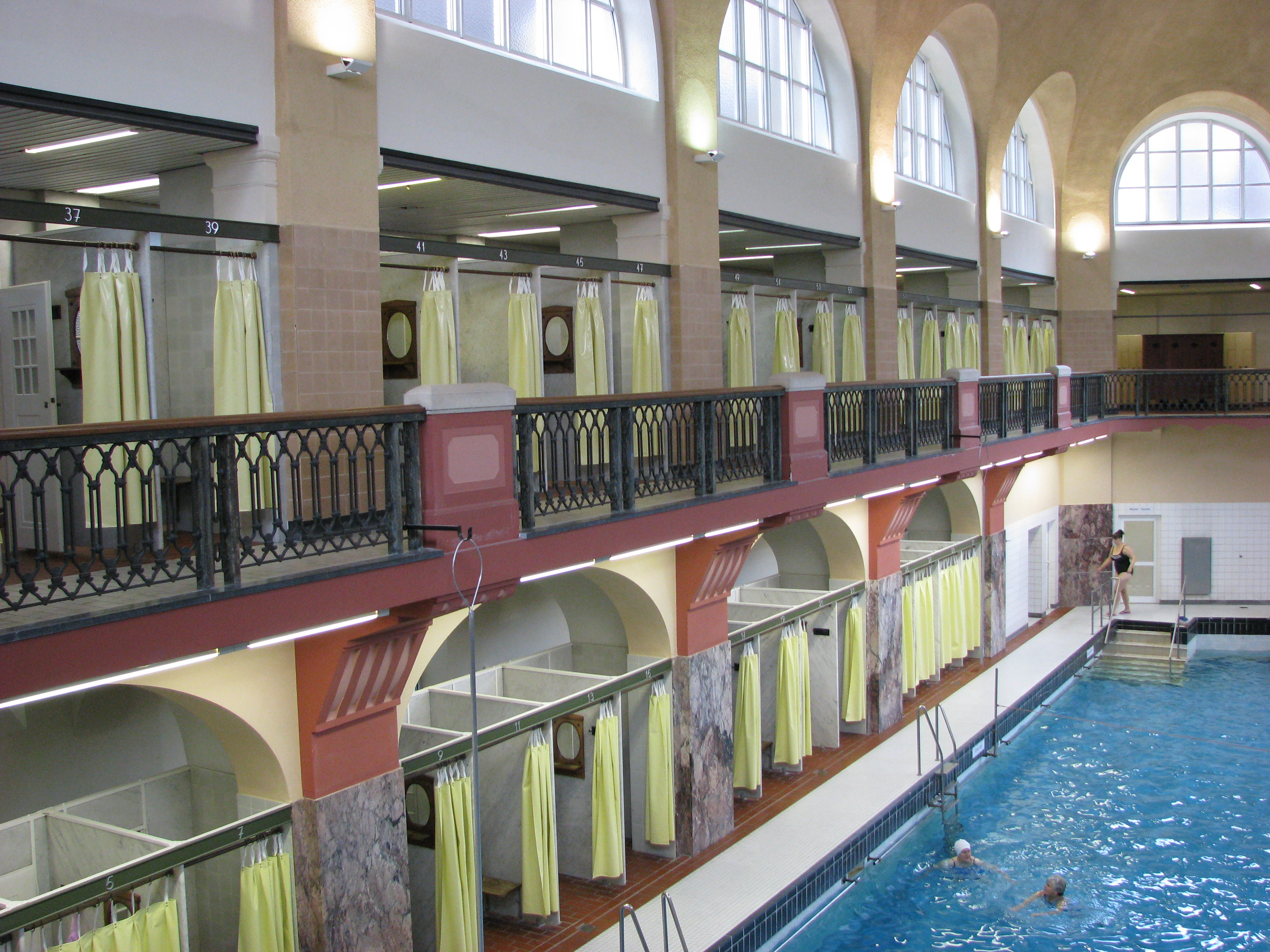

Elisabethhalle (German: Elisabethhalle) is a historic indoor swimming pool in Aachen, North Rhine-Westphalia, Germany. Built between 1908 and 1911, it is one of the few remaining Art Nouveau public bathhouses in Germany that are still in operation.

== History ==
Construction of the Elisabethhalle began in 1908 and was completed in 1911. It has continuously operated as a public swimming facility since its opening.

In September 2011, the building underwent a major renovation, reported to be the most extensive refurbishment in approximately 35 years.

== Architecture ==
The building is designed in the Art Nouveau style and retains numerous original decorative elements, including wooden paneling, mosaic columns, wrought-iron railings, and classical-style sculptures. A statue of Asclepius is located at the entrance.

The interior features early ceramic tile work along the corridors leading to the main pool, as well as marble changing rooms and a surrounding gallery structure. The building is noted for the preservation of its historic architectural details.

== Usage ==
The Elisabethhalle is primarily open to adult members of the public, including students, employees, and retirees. It also serves as a designated swimming facility for schools in central Aachen.

Since September 2024, the facility has introduced designated swimming sessions for transgender individuals.
