= Old Synagogue (Aachen) =

The Old Synagogue was a synagogue in Aachen, Germany built between 1860 and 1862 according to the plans and under the supervision of the Aachen architect Wilhelm Wickop. The synagogue was located on Promenaden-Platz, which since 1984 has been called Synagogenplatz. It was destroyed in 1938 during Kristallnacht, like many Jewish places of worship in Germany.

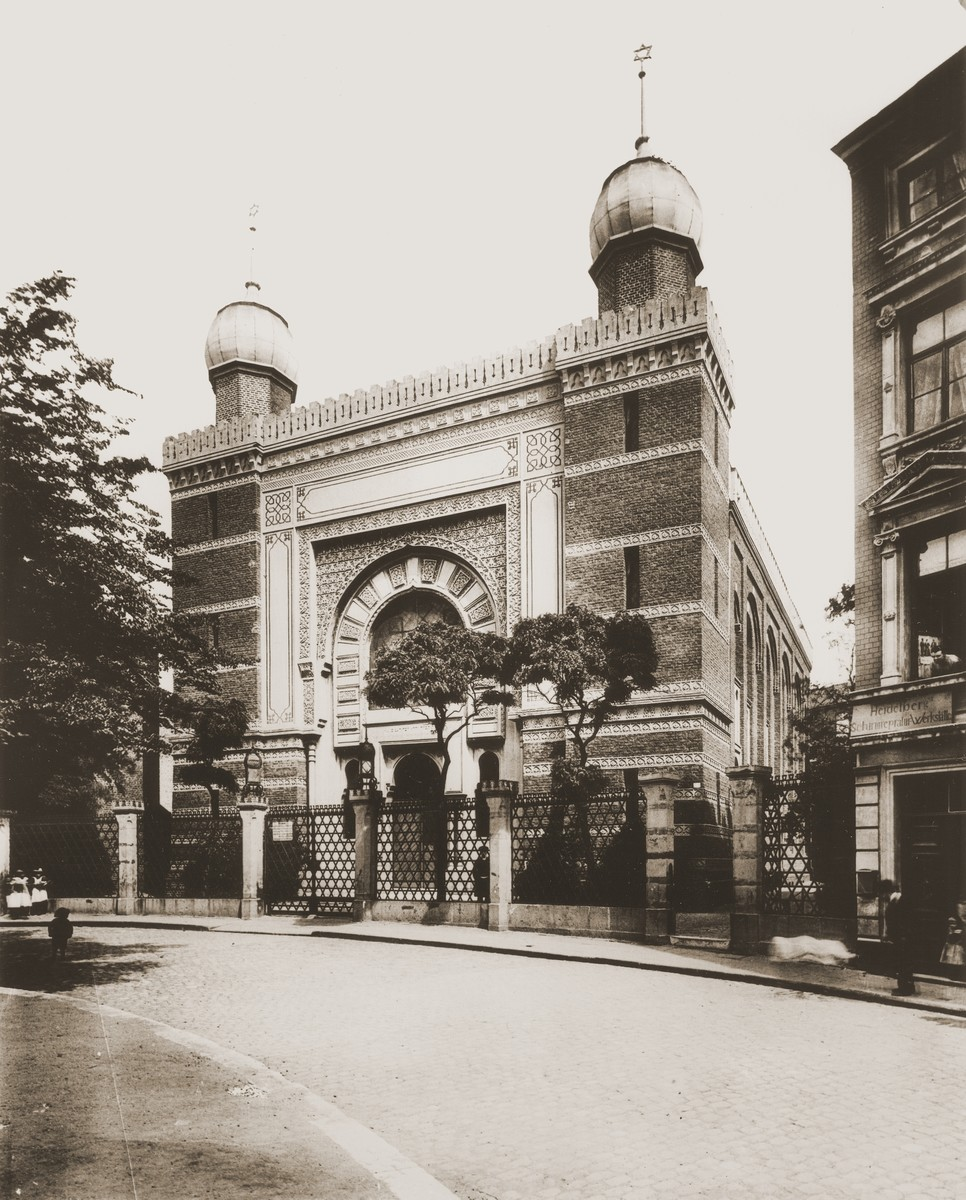
Old Synagogue facade
