= Aesthetics (textile) =

Concept of serviceability of textiles

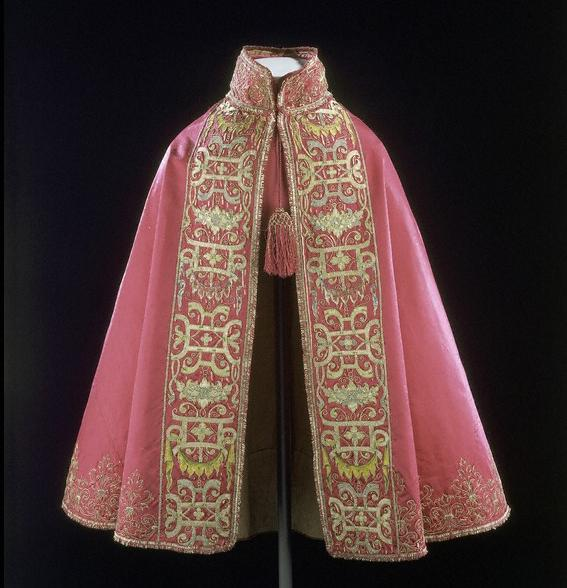
Cloak, 1580–1600 V&A Museum no. 793–1901 Techniques – Red satin, couched and embroidered with silver, silver-gilt and coloured silk threads, trimmed with silver-gilt and silk thread fringe and tassel, and lined with pink linen

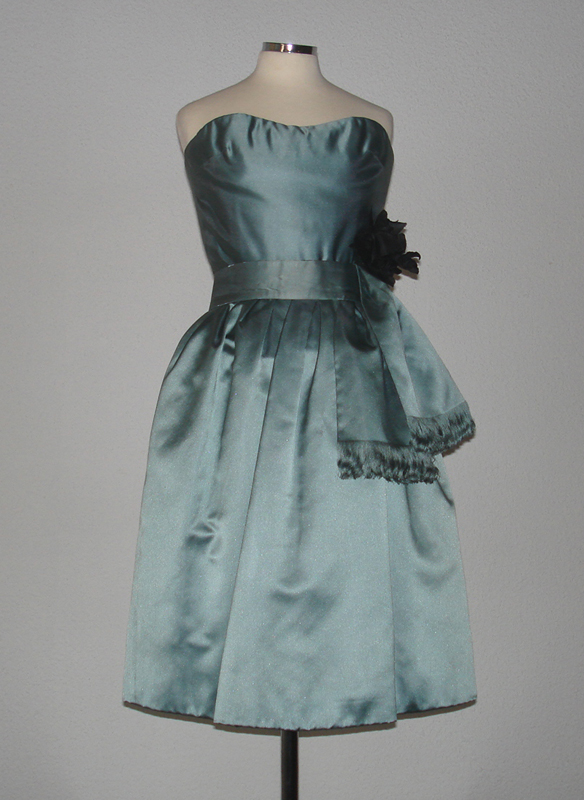
Blue satin strapless cocktail dress by Yves Saint Laurent for Christian Dior, Paris, 1959

Aesthetics in textiles is one of the basic concepts of the serviceability of textiles. It is determined by the perception of touch and sight. Aesthetics imply the appearance and attraction of textile products; it includes the color and texture of the material. It is a statement about the end user (consumer) and the target market. When combined with fabric construction, the finish of the clothing material, garment fit, style, and fashion compatibility, colours create an aesthetic comfort. All of these elements work together to satisfy our visual perception. Aesthetics incorporates the role of evaluation (analysing and judging) also.

There are various arts and applications that imparts aesthetic properties in textiles. Additionally, the use of LEDs and optical fibres enables the creation of aesthetic properties such as illuminated textiles.

== History ==
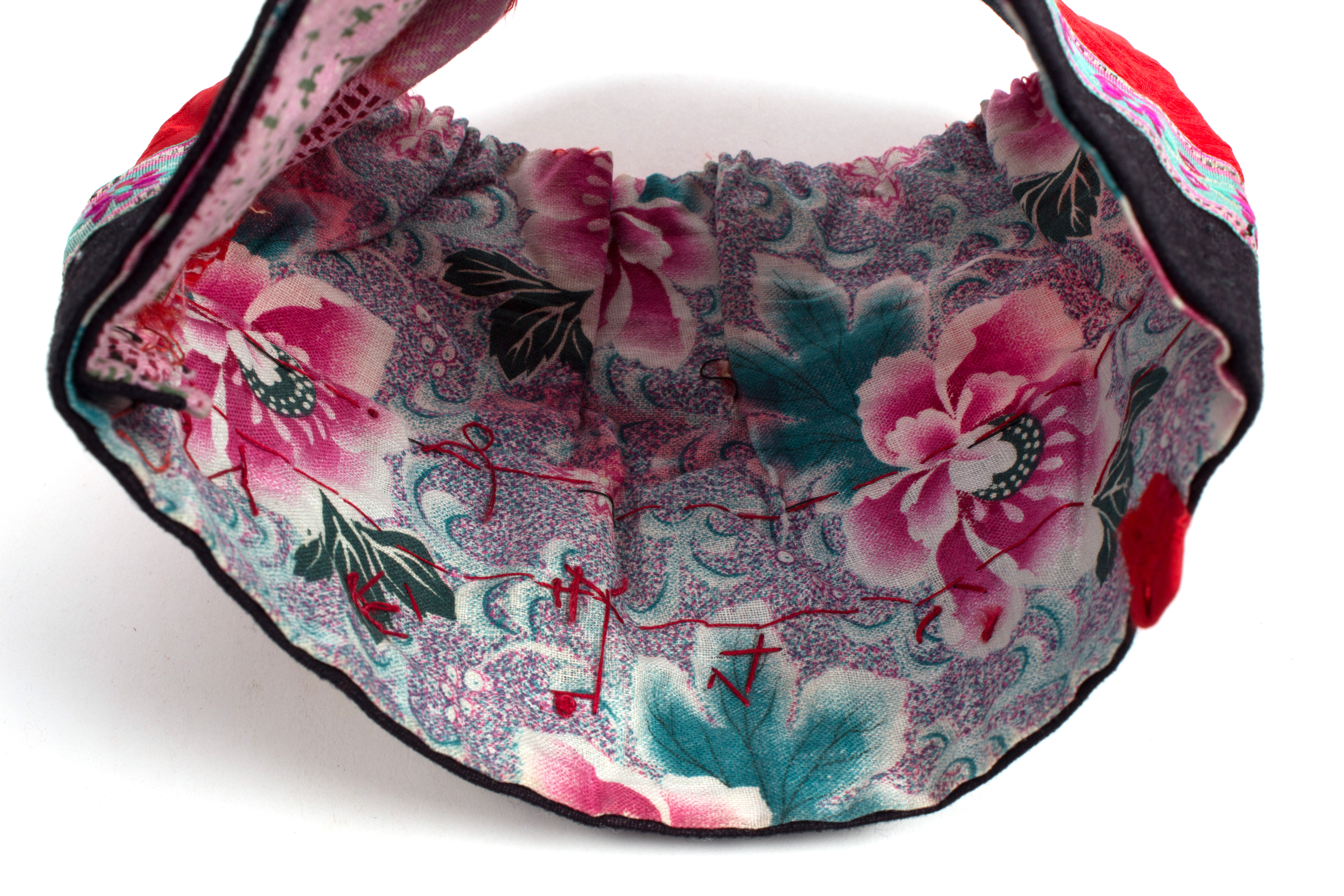
Infant's hat

From antiquity until the eighteenth century, the majority of textiles were crafted and decorated by hand. Human ingenuity and the desire to improve one’s appearance gradually led to the development of complex fabrics and, in the past hundred years, to remarkable technological advancements.

Self-decoration is prevalent across societies and is considered a fundamental human trait. The decorative function of clothing is often regarded as primary. Although protection from the elements is the most essential purpose of clothing, one of the earliest and most enduring motivations for wearing clothes has been self-adornment. Every culture has recorded some form of bodily decoration—even in societies where people did not traditionally wear clothing.

== Factors ==
Aesthetics is defined as the way a textile appears and feels. In terms of aesthetics, the material is a combination of texture, color, and pattern. Material for clothing include fabric (cloth, fur, leather) and accessories (buttons, zips, gemstones, and embellishments, etc.). These aesthetic elements work together to determine how the material looks, fits, and feels.

There are various factors that affect the aesthetics of a textile product; many are listed below. These factors are produced using methods of textiles manufacturing and the application of finishes such as dyeing, printing, glazing, and napping.

=== Color ===
Color is a visual characteristic that is described by terms like red, orange, yellow, green, blue, purple, etc. Typically, it is the color of an object that attracts the most attention. Color is one of the primary properties that is noticed when a consumer makes a decision to buy a dress. The colors are distinctive and distinguishable; we frequently refer to clothing by its color, for instance, a "blue shirt."

=== Luster ===
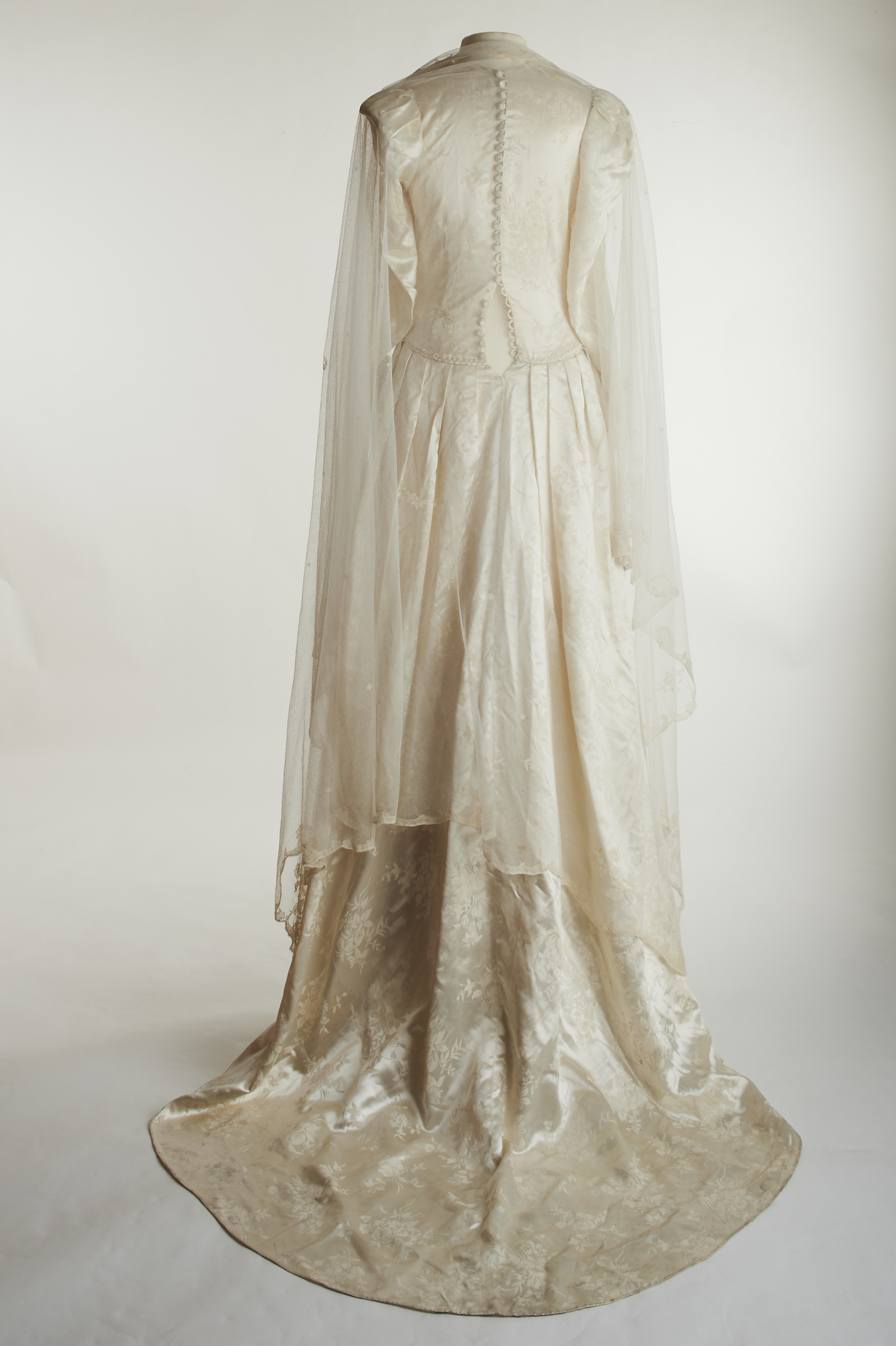
This wedding dress and veil were designed by Sybil Connolly while she was working at Richard Alan on Grafton St, Dublin. The dress is satin with a full-length Limerick lace veil.

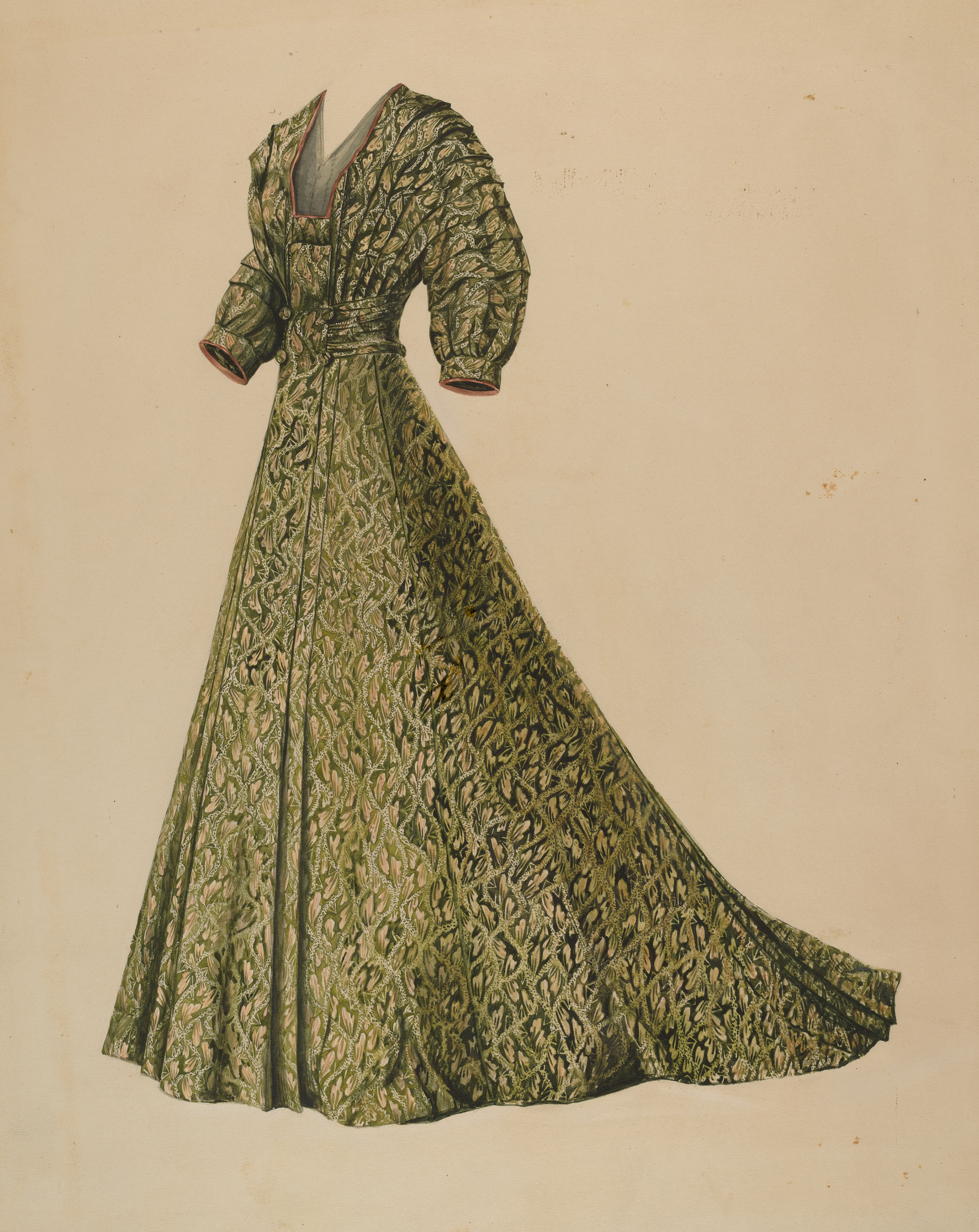
Isabelle De Strange, Brocade Costume, c. 1938, NGA 13643

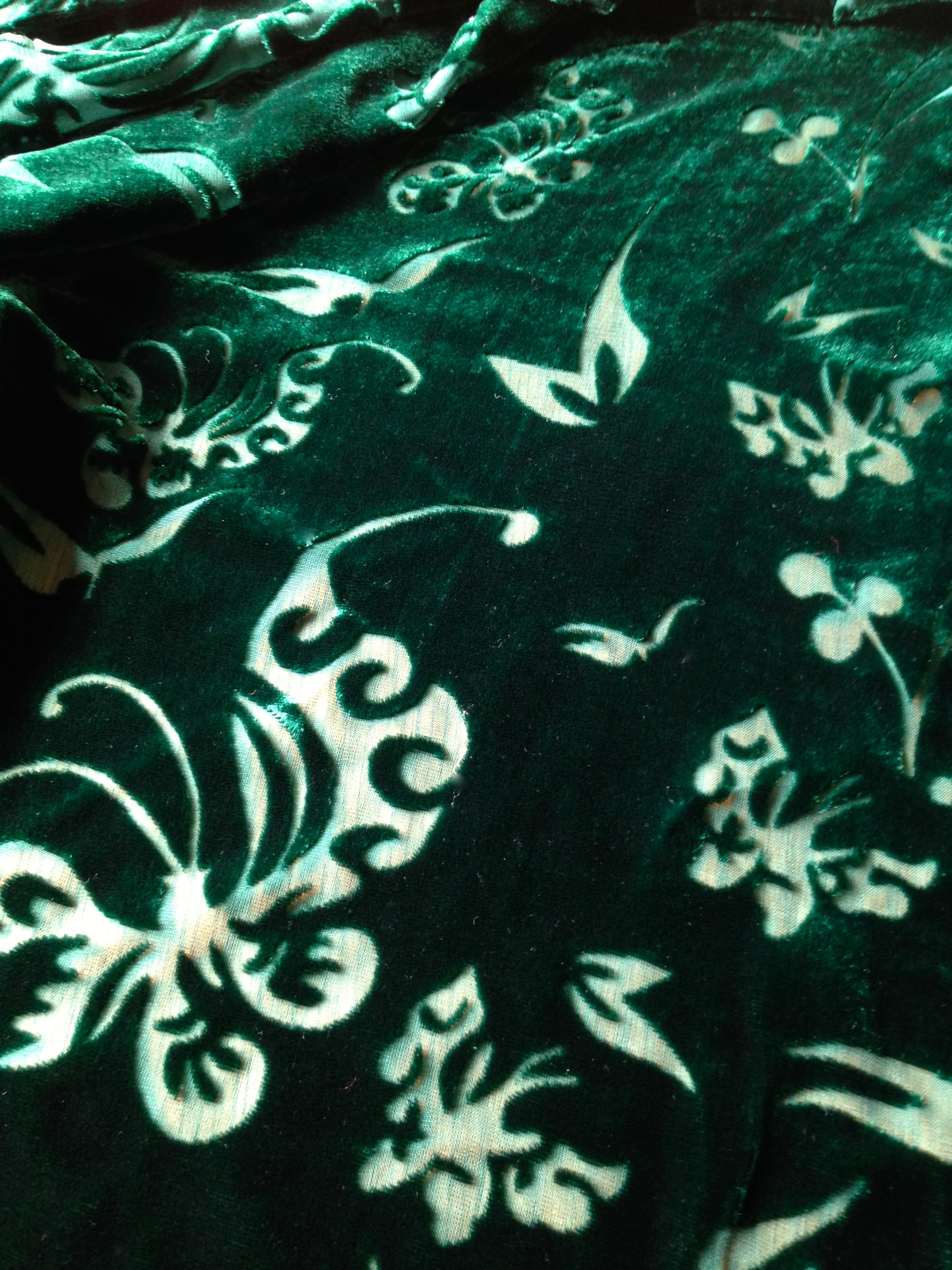
Devoré velvet (also known as burnout technique)

Luster is a physical property that makes them appear bright, glossy, and shiny. The amount of light reflected from the surface of a fiber is referred to as its luster. The level of luster is determined by how light reflects off the surface. Certain natural fibers, such as linen and silk, have an inherent luster.

=== Texture ===
Texture in textiles characterizes the surface as rough or smooth, which is determined by tactile and visual perception. The texture of textiles is affected by yarn manipulations, finishing techniques, and fabric structures.

=== Drape ===
Drape (draping or fabric drape) is the property of different textile materials how they fold, fall, or hang along with a three-dimensional body. Draping depends upon the fiber characteristics and the flexibility, looseness, and softness of the material. Drape finishes can also alter the draping properties of clothes.

=== Hand ===
Hand or hand feel in textiles is the property of fabrics related to the touch that expresses sensory comfort. It refers to the way fabrics feel against the skin or in the hand and conveys information about the cloth's softness and smoothness.

== Techniques of improving aesthetics in textiles ==
=== Texturising ===
The fibres, which serve as the building blocks, contribute to the aesthetic appeal of a fabric. Natural fibres have inherent aesthetics, whereas synthetic fibres are altered during the manufacturing process to meet desired specifications. Texture in textiles refers to the surface's roughness or smoothness, as determined by tactile and visual perception. Yarn manipulations, finishing techniques, and fabric structures all have an impact on textile texture. Textile fibers come in a variety of shapes and forms. The fiber shape of synthetic fibers is controlled with a device spinneret during manufacturing (extrusion) process, whereas natural fibers conceive their shape with a variety of factors such as cellulose built up in plant fibers, and in silk, the shape of orifice from where the silk fibers are extruded. In hair fibers, it is hair follicle that is responsible for the shape.

Shape of fibers and characteristics
Shape	Characteristics of the fiber
Oval or round	Smooth, soft and slippery feel, reflectance value high, poor covering properties.
Dog bone	Feels harsher than round shaped fibers, high luster, covering properties excellent.
Flat	Reflection of light is higher than that of a round shape.
Trilobal	Trilobal fibers have three sides. They feel like silk fibers and their reflection of light is higher than those round shaped fibers.
Pentalobal	Pentalobal is a structure resembling a five-sided star. The Pentalobal shaped fibre imparts a subtle sheen and bulkiness.
Octolobal	Octolobal, a shape with compressed hexagons. The fibers with Octolobal shape have subdued luster. Flatter sides reflect or disperse the light.
Multilobal	Multilobal, a fibre shape characterised by a large number of pentalobal lobes. Each lobe reflects light in some way.

=== Blending ===
Blending of textile fibers, and yarns during manufacturing also results in various aesthetic effects such as Devoré, and Heather, etc.

=== Zari ===
Zari is used in brocade; these are the threads of gold or silver.

=== Brocade ===
Brocade is a decorative weaving.

=== Embroidery ===
Embroidery is the art or handicraft of decorating fabrics with thread patterns using a needle.

== Finishing ==
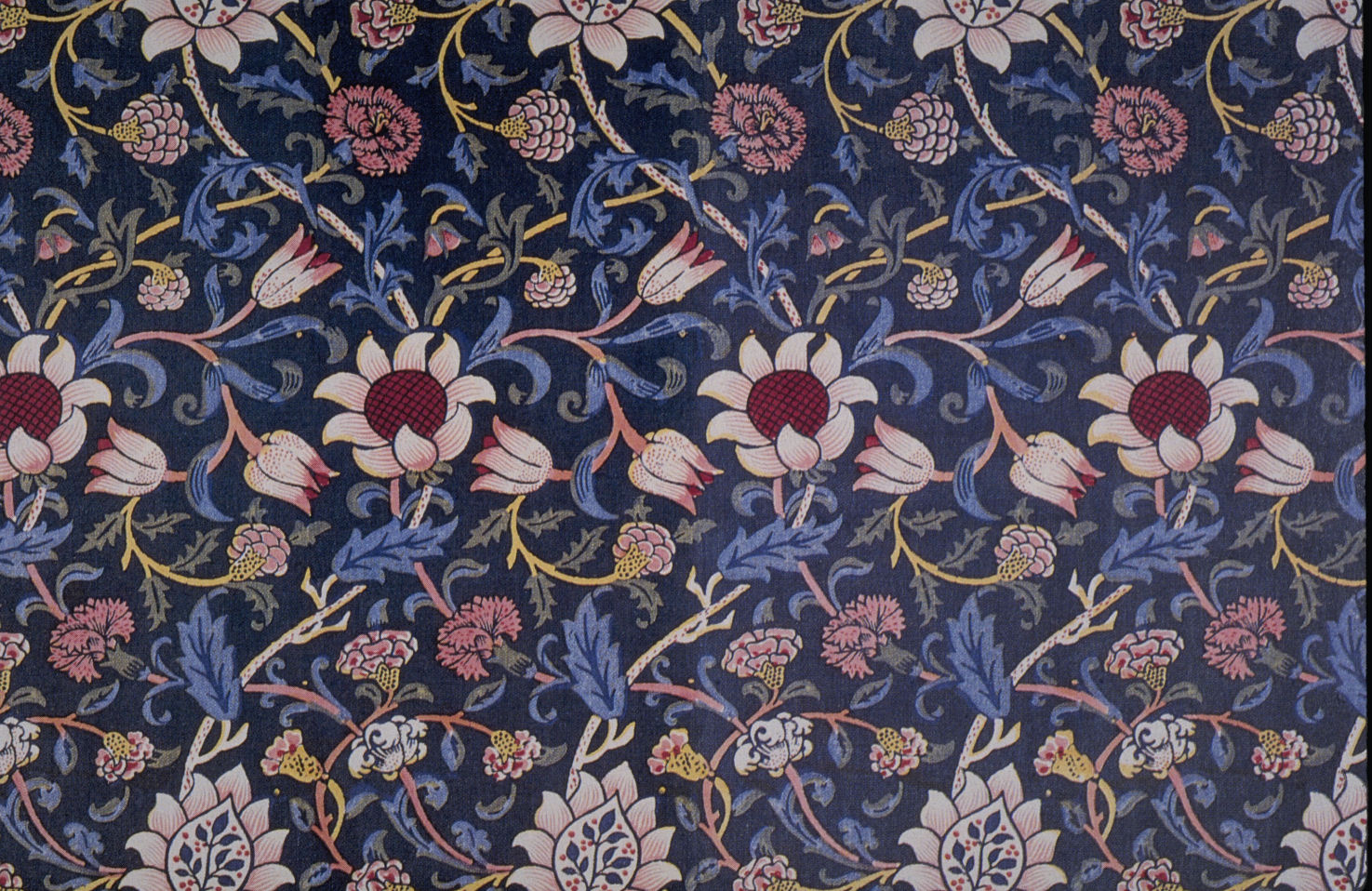
Printed textile

Finishing of textiles include improving of looks and functionality of the treated goods.

=== Dyeing ===
Dyeing is the process of applying color to textiles.

=== Printing ===
Textile printing is a method of applying patterns to textile materials with various printing techniques.

==== Aesthetic finishes ====
There is a range of textile finishes that alter the appearance and feel of the textiles.

===== Mechanical finishes =====
Mechanical finish signifies machine finishes such as embossing, heat setting, sanforizing, sheering, various, luster imparting, surface finishes, and glaze finishes.

Mechanical Finishes
Raised surface finishes	Luster imparting	Glaze and design
Gigging	Calendering	Embossing
Napping	Beetling	Moire
Sueding		
Flocking		

Calendering can be done in a variety of ways, including moiréing, embossing, glazing and ciréing. The fabric is passed through heated cylinders to achieve a variety of finishes with varying surface effects.

===== Chemical finishes =====
Chemical finishes is a part of the textile finishing process where the emphasis is on chemical substances instead of mechanical finishing. These are some chemical finishes that change the surface characteristics:

- Silk surfacing, is a surface finishing of cotton to obtain an appearance similar to silk.
- Parchmentising, is an acid finish that turns the cellulosic fabrics into crisp and sheer fabrics such as Organdy.
- Wrinkle-resistant finish is a finish that capacitates treated fabric with wrinkle resistant.
- Deweighting, or weight reduction, is a treatment for polyester to make it like silk. The treatment peels the surface and reduces the fiber weight and strength while making them softer and finer. Additionally, the treatment enhances the absorbency of the treated substrates.

== Evaluation ==
Most of the aesthetic properties of textile materials are subjective and determined by visual and tactile sensations. However, some of them are measurable with KES (Kawabata evaluation system). The system is equipped with standardised testing machines capable of objectively determining specific physical properties. KES-F can be used to determine the fabric's roughness and smoothness, friction, sheerness, thickness, tensile strength, elasticity, drape, and compression, among other properties.

== Significance ==
It is an interesting question how far men would retain their relative rank if they were divested of their clothes.

— Henry David Thoreau

Users have five basic performance criteria to consider: appearance (aesthetics of the product), comfort, durability, maintenance, and cost. According to the consumer preference study, the appearance factor is considered one of the top priorities when making buying decisions about clothing. Aesthetics in textiles is important in many ways, clothing is a visual signifier. It has communicative powers.

=== Semiotics of dress ===
The study of semiotics deciphers the ways in which ideologies get transmitted through dress. The study of how people use clothing and adornments to signify cultural and societal status is known as the "semiotics of dress."

==== Fashion symbolism ====
A video on social expression through dress

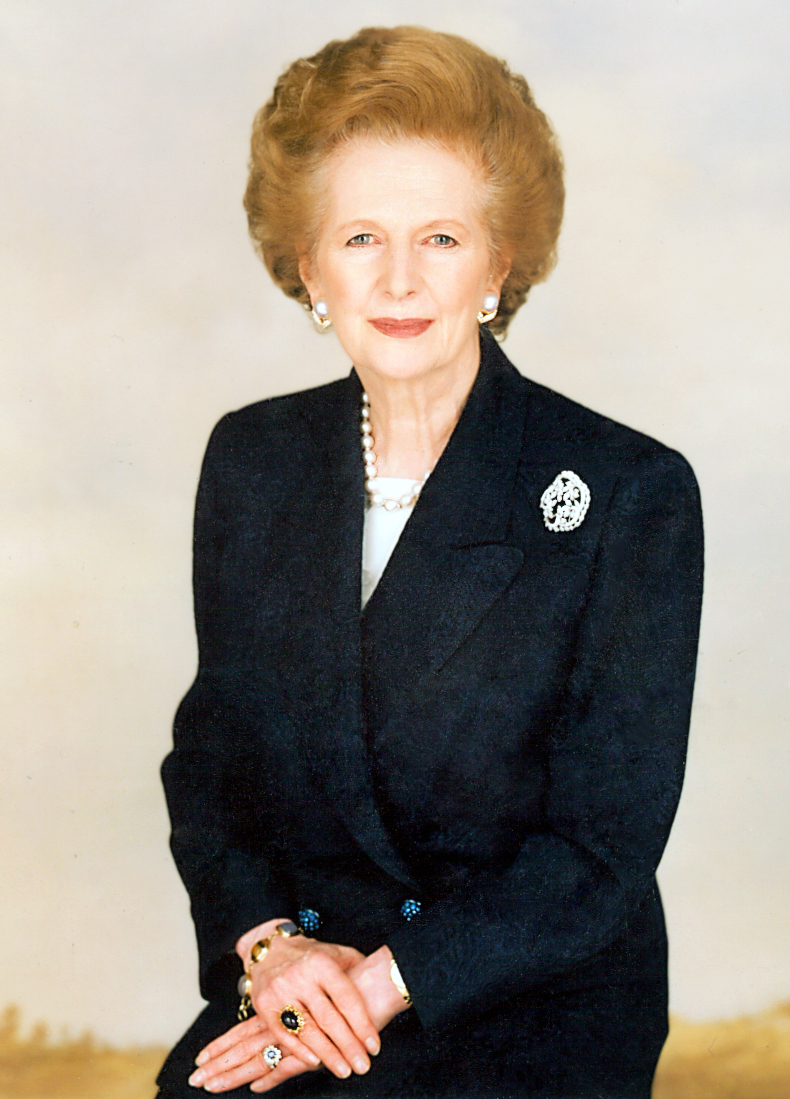
Margaret Thatcher wearing a typical power dressing outfit

Different cultures, occasions, and social statuses command specific aesthetics that include clothing and decorations.

The art of applying design, aesthetics, clothing construction, and natural beauty to clothing is known as fashion design. Fashion symbolism is used in fashion designs to convey expressive content and emotions by fashion designers. In fashion symbolism, fashion designs can communicate emotions like "excitement, calmness, strength, and delicacy" through aesthetic expression.

The term "power dressing" refers to a fashion trend popular in the 1970s and 1980s in the business and political worlds. During the 1960s, Jackie Kennedy was a great fashion icon for American women, and her style became a sign of wealth, power, and distinction.

==== Personal appearance ====
Personal appearance is important because others judge us based on how we look. When meeting someone for the first time, the first seven to ten seconds have a significant impact on others. Most certainly, it is based on physical appearance.

== Problems ==
Pilling, Color fastness (staining of certain fabrics), and snagging are a few problems associated with aesthetics in synthetic textiles.

== See also ==
- Product development (textiles)
- Surface contour (fiber)
- Cross section (fiber)
- Texturizing
- Structuralism
- Visual sociology
