= Texturizing =

Process by which synthetic fibres are modified to change their texture

Texturising or texturizing is the process by which synthetic fibres are modified to change their texture - the physical appearance of the fibre. Texturising techniques can include bulking (where thermoplastic fibres are twisted, heat set and untwisted), crimping and coiling, amongst others. Texturising takes advantage of the thermoplastic nature of synthetic fibres, and uses it to set texturised features in place.

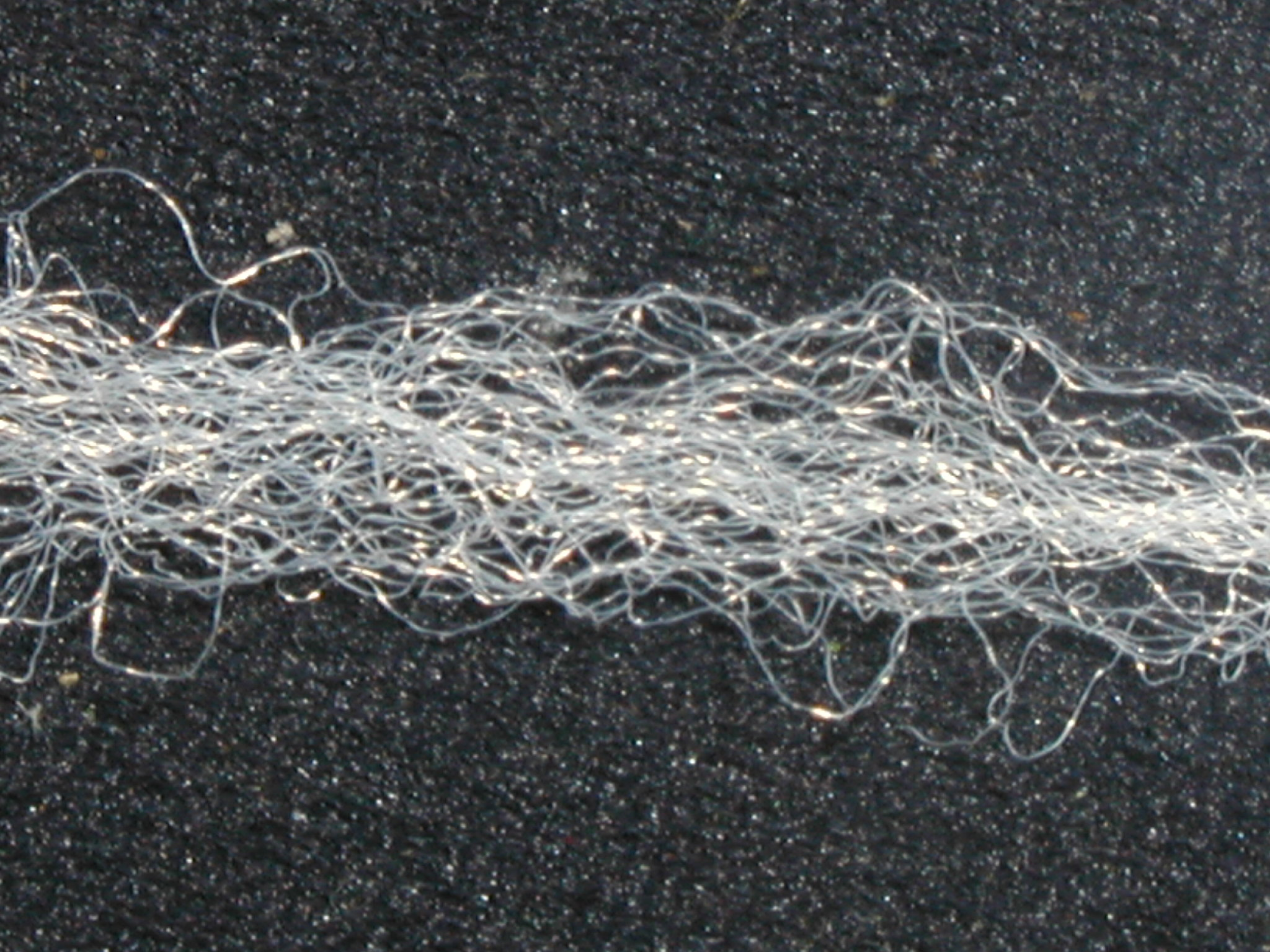
Texturized yarn

Fibres may be texturised to improve the fibre's insulation properties (as processes like bulking allow it to trap air better), to minimise a shiny, synthetic-looking appearance, to reduce the silky nature of the fibre, or to create special effects (fancy yarns).

These modifications will also affect the eventual fabric, and fibres may be folded, looped, coiled or crinkled in order to improve the drape, appearance, luster, warmth, elasticity or handle of the finished fabric. Texturising can reduce the "synthetic" appearance of a finished fabric, bringing its appearance closer to that of a natural fibre fabric.

== Texture ==
Texture in textiles characterises the surface as rough or smooth, which is determined by tactile and visual perception. The texture of textiles is affected by yarn manipulations, finishing techniques, and fabric structures.

== See also ==
- Aesthetics (textile)
- Cross section (fiber)
