= Air sock =

Ventilation unit

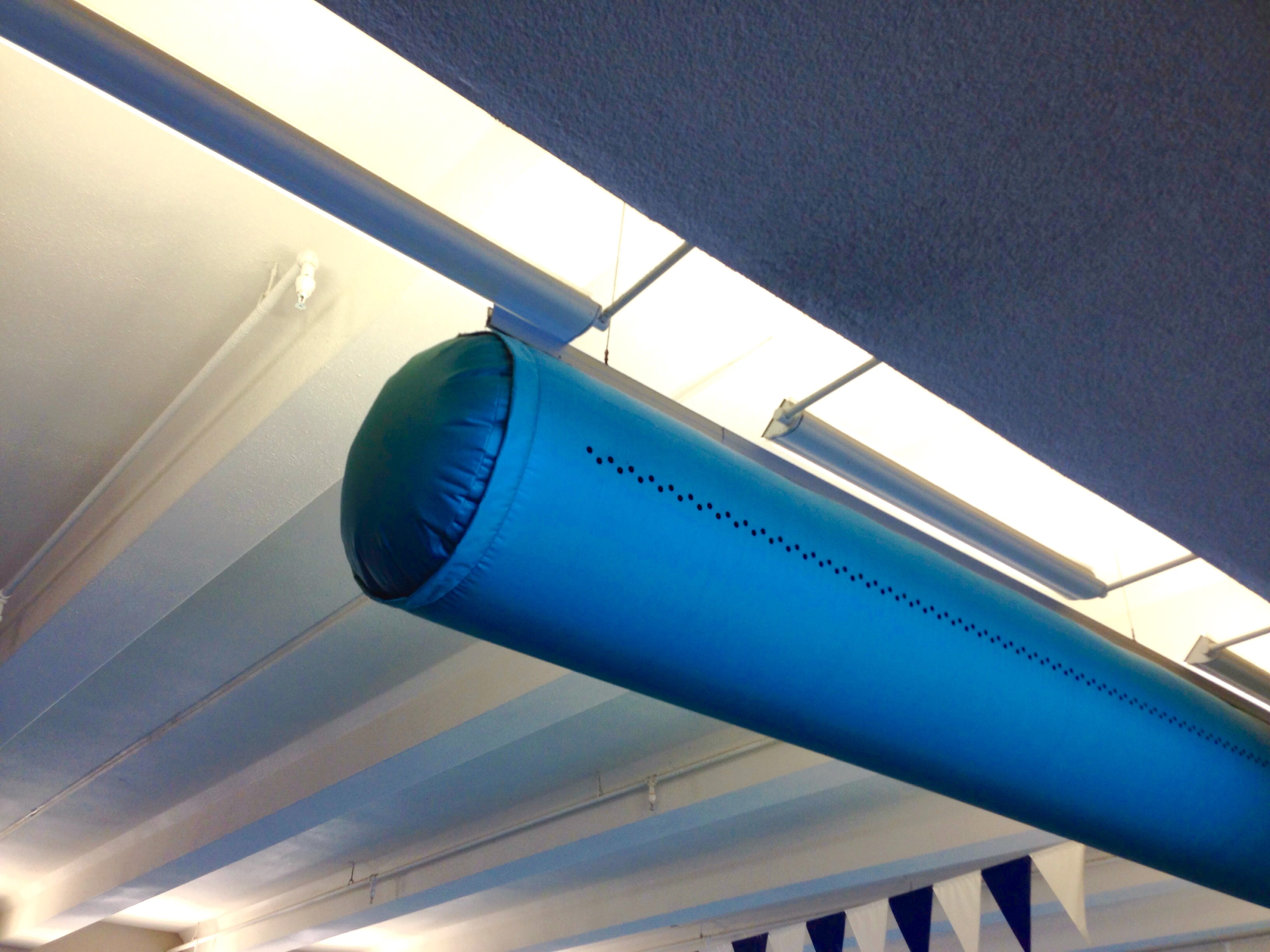
Air sock in an indoor swimming pool

An air sock is a textile or fabric duct used for draught-free air distribution and delivery of conditioned air as an alternative to traditional spiral or rectangular steel ducts with grilles and diffusers. Fabric ducts are usually cheaper in material cost, do not require additional diffusers, and can be installed more quickly than conventional metal systems.

== Overview ==
The ducts can be suspended on any type of ceiling, as the ducts only weigh approximately 1–5 kg (2 1/5–11 lb) depending on the duct size. Air socks are mounted on extruded aluminium rails or cables, these are hung from the ceiling and continually support the ducts along their length.

The systems are flexible and can be tailored to accommodate a wide variety of rooms and applications. Low velocity systems diffuse air through the fabric surface or through micro perforations in the fabric, while higher velocity mixing systems use laser cut perforations or textile nozzles to throw the air.

Ducts can be made in various shapes, including half-rounds (D shape), quarter-rounds, circle sections, ovals, and rectangles. They can be designed with internal or external suspension systems to help maintain the shape of the duct without airflow.

Fabric ducting usually costs less than traditional ducting systems, and the installation time is significantly shorter. Air socks are also easier to clean than rigid ducting because they can be dismounted and cleaned using a washing machine, whereas rigid ducting cannot be removed easily and is generally not as accessible for cleaning, requiring special tools and maneuvering for cleaning; this leads to the ducts not being cleaned, or being cleaned less often.

Fabric is more flammable than metal, so fabric ducts may require fireproofing considerations, including the use of flame-resistant fabrics such as polyethylene, in order to meet fire safety requirements.

The operational performance of fabric ducts is governed by internal static pressure and fabric permeability. Engineering calculations regarding duct diameter, volumetric flow rate (CFM), and perforation design are essential to ensure homogeneous air distribution and prevent performance degradation in various industrial and commercial environments."What is a Fabric Duct? The Complete Engineering Guide to Fabric Air Dispersion Systems". AirSox.

== See also ==
- Product development (textiles)
- Technical textile
- Trickle vent
- Windsock
