= Report of the National Commission on Terrorism =

The Report of the National Commission on Terrorism, also known as the Bremer Commission, "Countering The Changing Threat of International Terrorism", Pursuant to Public Law 277, 105th Congress, was published June 2000. Ambassador Paul Bremer served as Chairman, and Maurice Sonnenberg served as Vice Chairman.

== Conclusions ==
- International terrorism poses an increasingly dangerous and difficult threat to America.
- Countering the growing danger of the terrorist threat requires significantly stepping up U.S. efforts.
- Priority one is to prevent terrorist attacks. U.S. intelligence and law enforcement communities must use the full scope of their authority to collect intelligence regarding terrorist plans and methods.
- U.S. policies must firmly target all states that support terrorists.
- Private sources of financial and logistical support for terrorists must be subjected to the full force and sweep of U.S. and international laws.
- A terrorist attack involving a biological agent, deadly chemicals, or nuclear or radiological material, even if it succeeds only partially, could profoundly affect the entire nation. The government must do more to prepare for such an event.
- The President and Congress should reform the system for reviewing and funding departmental counterterrorism programs to ensure that the activities and programs of various agencies are part of a comprehensive plan.

The most controversial conclusions included the Report's call "for the monitoring of all foreign students, using criminals and terrorists as American spies, and making wiretapping easier" (Lodal, 2001, p. 100).

The report clearly names state sponsors of terrorism including Iran and Syria. It specifically says this about Iran's involvement:

The Department of State's 1999 "Patterns of Global Terrorism" provides the following account of Iranian support for terrorism:

- Iran's security forces conducted several bombings against Iranian dissidents abroad.
- Iran has increasingly encouraged and supported—with money, training, and weapons—terrorist groups such as Hizballah, HAMAS, the PIJ, and Ahmed Jibril's PFLP-GC.
- Iran continues to provide a safehaven to elements of PKK, a Kurdish militant group that has conducted numerous attacks in Turkey and against Turkish targets in Europe.
- Iran also provides support to terrorist groups in North Africa and South and Central Asia, including financial assistance and training.

It recommends name Afghanistan, under the Taliban, as a state sponsor:

"Recommendation:

- The Secretary of State should designate Afghanistan as a sponsor of terrorism and impose all the sanctions that apply to state sponsors. "

== Commissioners ==
(See Appendix C of the Report)

- Paul Bremer, Chairman; Managing Director of Kissinger Associates
- Maurice Sonnenberg, Vice Chairman
- Richard K. Betts
- Wayne A. Downing
- Jane Harman
- Fred Ikle
- Juliette Kayyem
- John F. Lewis, Jr.
- Gardner Peckham
- R. James Woolsey, Jr.

== See also ==
- 9/11 Commission
- Hart-Rudman Task Force on Homeland Security
- Homeland security
- U.S. Commission on National Security/21st Century / Hart-Rudman Commission
