= Luster (textiles) =

Physical property of textiles

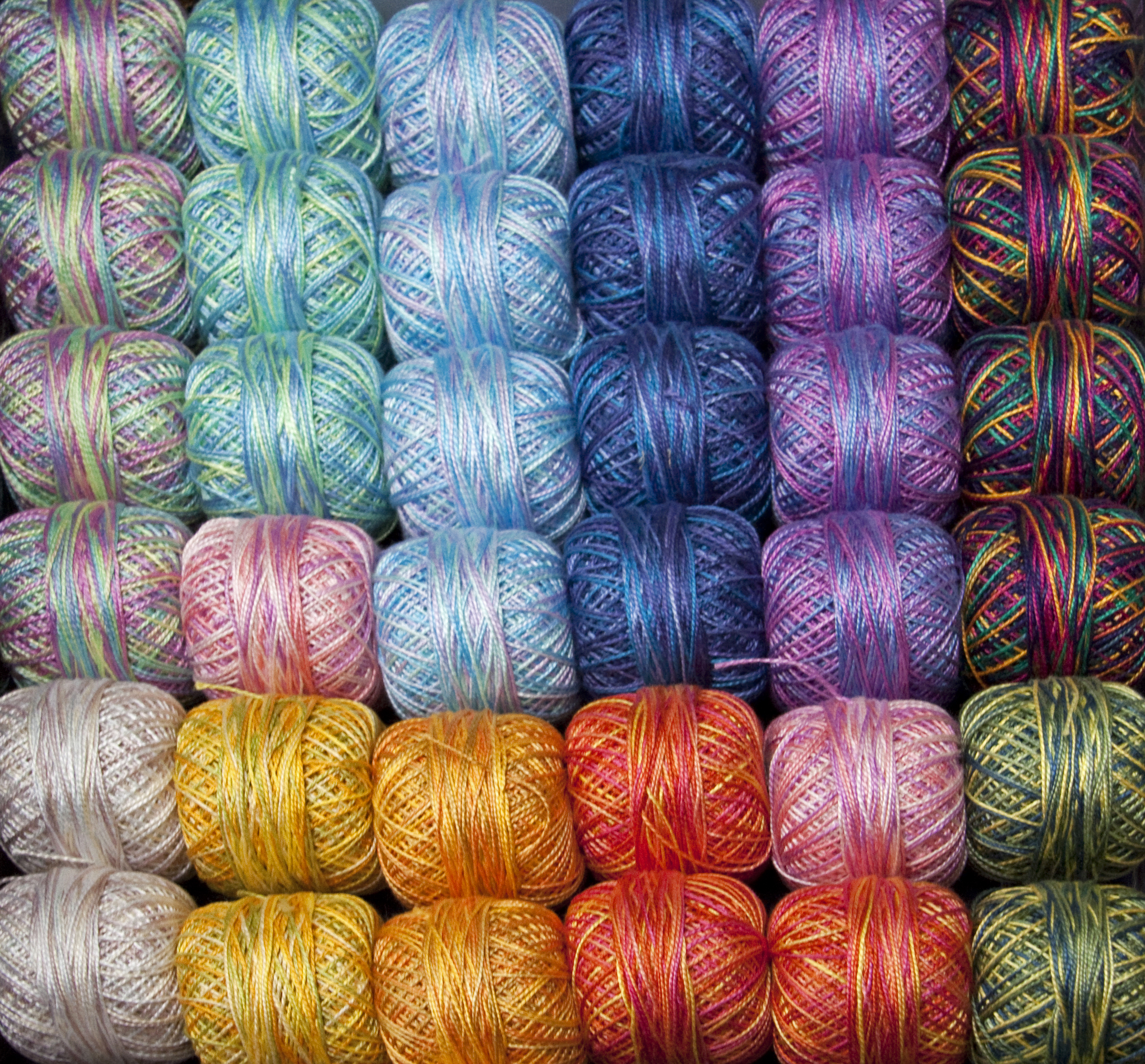
Lustrous silk yarns

In textiles, lustre or luster is a physical property that makes them appear bright, glossy, and shiny. The amount of light reflected from the surface of a fiber is referred to as its luster. The level of luster is determined by how light reflects off the surface. For example, a round surfaced fiber reflects more light and appears shinier than a fiber with an irregular surface. Synthetic fibers with a more regular surface seem brighter than natural fibers with an irregular surface, with the exception of silk, which has a regular surface.

== Objective ==
Luster is the degree of gloss or sheen possessed by the fiber or textile surface. Luster adds aesthetic value to fabrics, contributing to their attractiveness. Occasionally, this adds value to their quality assessment. In some cases, when lustre is undesirable, fibres are purposefully dulled by the addition of substances.

== Factors ==
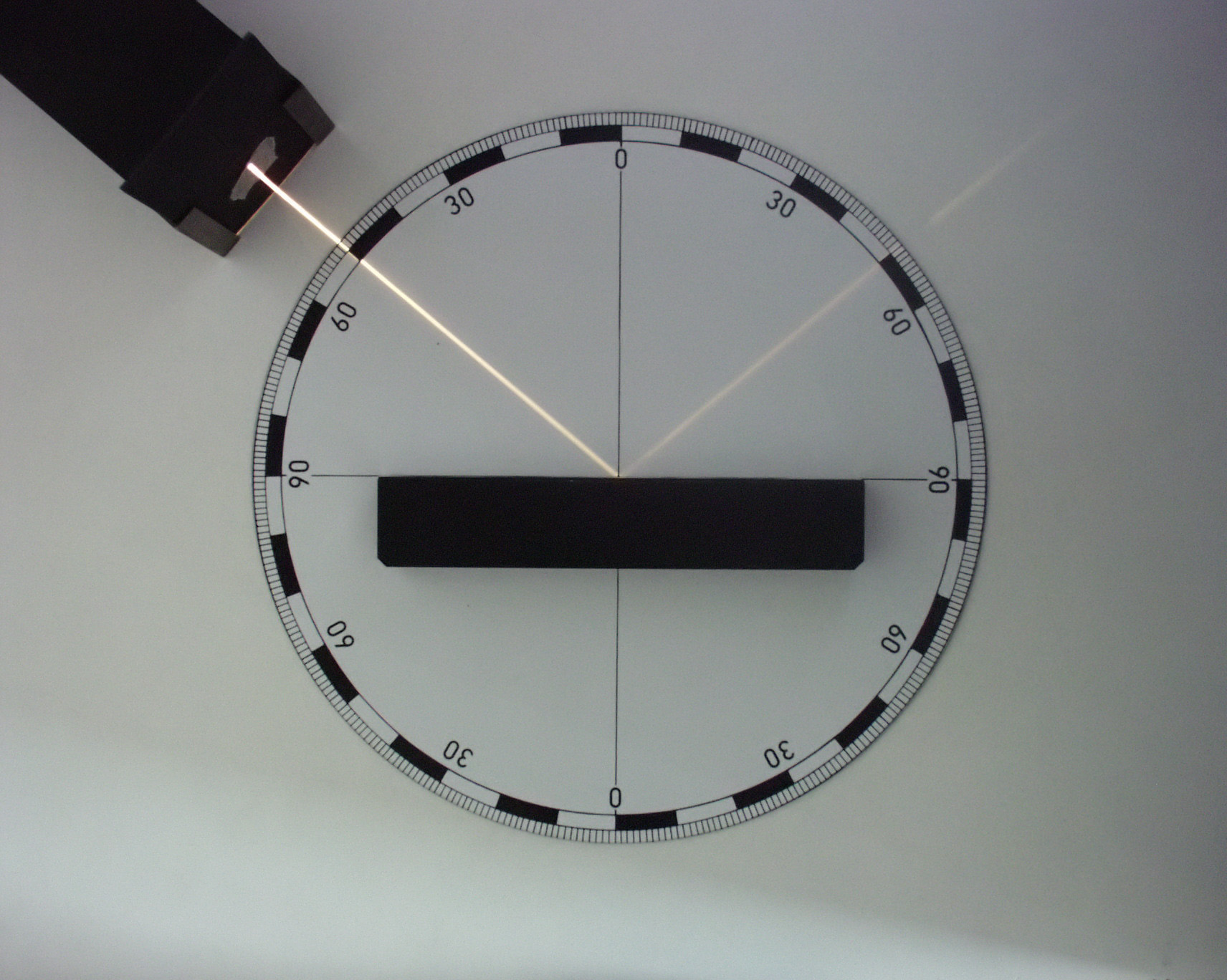
An example of the law of reflection

Factors affecting ''lustre (the way light reflects)'' lie with fiber properties, but various processes can also alter the surface of textiles and transform the fabric luster. Surface manipulation has a significant impact on light reflection. Rough surfaces absorb and scatter light, while neat and clean surfaces reflect more light.

=== Lustering ===
==== Fiber structure ====
Crystalline structured fibers possess a higher luster than the amorphous structure. Secondly smooth surface and cross section of the fiber plays a vital role in reflecting the light. The rounded edges and triangular cross section of the silk fiber contribute to its luster properties; in some cases, synthetic fibres mimic this trilobal shape for a silk-like appearance.

==== Finishes ====
'Lustering' refers to any process that uses steam, heat, or pressure to enhance the lustre.

Other than fiber structure, it is chemical orientation and different finishing methods such as singeing, heat-setting, calendering, silk surfacing, mercerizing, and bio polishing, etc.

- Cotton when mercerized has a round cross-section that appears brighter than untreated cotton (with a bean cut view.)
- Satin is a lustrous fabric structure created by the combination of a weave, finish and silk. Satin embraces exceptional brilliance.

==== Luster describing terms ====
- When fibers have a high degree of luster, they are described as bright.
- The term "matte" refers to something that is relatively dull or not have luster.
- Dull that is devoid of luster.
- Extra dull fibers are those that lack luster and appear opaque.

=== Delustering ===
In opposite delustrant, the substances that reduce the luster are added in synthetic fibers. As their names imply, they can be described as "clear," "bright," "dull," "semi-dull," "extra dull," and "super dull" with regards to the amount of luster. Scattering and absorbing light tends to cause the fibre to appear duller because of the delustrating additive, such as titanium dioxide.

== Luster index ==
Earlier, there was ambiguity in the results of luster in textiles. A new approach has been developed to analyze the luster through images. Devices can measure luster in textiles by analyzing the luminance of images taken from various angles.

== See also ==
- Hand feel, the feel of the fabrics.
- Draping
- Shearing (textiles)
