= Max Iklé =

Swiss official (1903–1999)

- Official portrait, 1956

General Director of the Swiss National Bank
- In office 1 January 1956 – 31 December 1968

Director of the Federal Finance Administration
- In office 15 February 1948 – 1 January 1956

Personal details
- Born: Max Arthur Iklé; 21 March 1903; St. Gallen, Switzerland
- Died: 3 December 1999 (aged 96); Zumikon, Switzerland
- Spouse: Beatrice "Beatrix" Heberlein (m. 1928; div. 1957)
- Children: 3, including Elisabeth
- Occupation: Attorney, industrialist, functionary, film producer

Max Arthur Iklé (21 March 1903 – 3 December 1999) was a Swiss attorney, industrialist and functionary who most notably served as General Director of the Swiss National Bank from 1956 to 1968. He previously served as Director of the Federal Finance Administration from 1948 to 1956. He was the father of Elisabeth Kopp, who served on the Federal Council (Switzerland).

== Early life and education ==
Iklé was born 21 March 1903 in St. Gallen, Switzerland, the second of three children, to German-born Adolph Iklé (1852–1923), embroidery manufacturer, and Anna Elisabeth Iklé (née Steinlin; 1868–1931). His siblings were; Curt Arnold Iklé (1902–1987) and Hans Adalbert Iklé. He also had three half siblings from his fathers first marriage.

His paternal family originally is of German Jewish descent from Hamburg. His father, Adolph Iklé (1852–1923), became a partner in the first machine embroidery company in Eastern Switzerland in 1880, which would turn into Iklé Frères which existed until 1929. His uncle was Leopold Iklé. His mother was a reformed Swiss.

Iklé completed his Juris Doctor at the University of Zurich in 1926.

== Career ==
He served as a director of the Federal Finance Administration from 1948 to 1956. Iklé was then appointed general director of the Swiss National Bank, a position he held until 1968.

== Personal life ==
On 16 October 1928, Iklé married Beatrice "Beatrix" Heberlein (1906–1988), a daughter of Georges Heberlein and Margaretha Heberlein (née Jenny). His father-in-law operated a textile firm as well producing the first mercerized yarns in Switzerland. They had three children;

- Marianne Iklé (1935–2019), a physician, married Gasser without issue.
- Anna Elisabeth Iklé colloquially Elisabeth Iklé (1936–2023), who served on the Federal Council (Switzerland), married to Dr. Hans W. Kopp (1931–2015), one daughter.
- Beatrix Iklé (born 1944), married Dr. Randolf Hanslin, a mechanical engineer and businessman, three children.

He was divorced in 1957. Iklé died 3 December 1999 at his residence in Zumikon near Zurich, Switzerland aged 96.
