= Elisabeth Kopp =

Swiss politician (1936–2023)

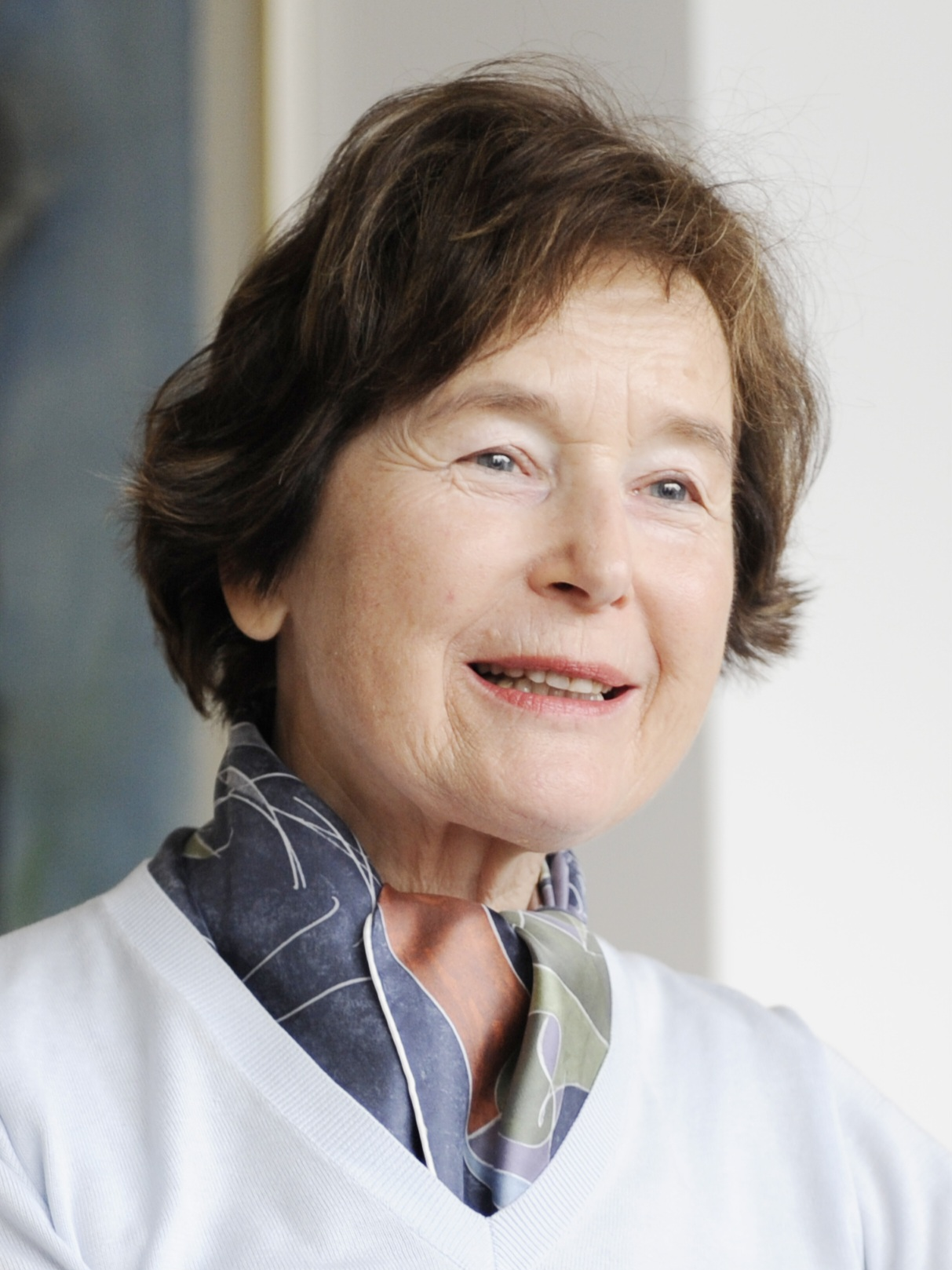
- Portrait, 2008s

Vice President of Switzerland
- In office 1 January 1989 – 12 January 1989
- President: Jean-Pascal Delamuraz
- Preceded by: Jean-Pascal Delamuraz
- Succeeded by: Arnold Koller

Minister of Justice and Police
- In office 2 October 1984 – 12 January 1989
- Preceded by: Rudolf Friedrich
- Succeeded by: Arnold Koller

Member of the Swiss Federal Council
- In office 2 October 1984 – 12 January 1989
- Preceded by: Rudolf Friedrich
- Succeeded by: Kaspar Villiger

Member of the Swiss National Council
- In office 26 November 1979 – 27 November 1983
- Constituency: Zürich

Personal details
- Born: Anna Elisabeth Iklé; 16 December 1936 Zürich, Switzerland
- Died: 7 April 2023 (aged 86) Zumikon, Zürich, Switzerland
- Party: FDP
- Spouse: Hans W. Kopp (m. 1960; died 2009)
- Children: 1
- Relatives: Fred Iklé (second cousin)
- Education: University of Zurich; University of Florence

Military service
- Allegiance: Switzerland
- Branch/service: Swiss Armed Forces
- Rank: Ambulance driver

Anna Elisabeth Kopp (née Iklé; 16 December 1936 – 7 April 2023) was a Swiss politician of the Free Democratic Party (FDP). She was the first woman to serve in the Swiss government, the Federal Council. She held that office from 2 October 1984 to 12 January 1989, when she resigned following a scandal over an alleged breach of official secrecy. She previously served as a member of the National Council from 1979 to 1984.

== Early life and education ==
Kopp was born Anna Elisabeth Iklé, on 16 December 1936 in Zurich, Switzerland, the second of three children, to Max Arthur Iklé (1903–1999), an attorney and film producer, and Beatrix Iklé (née Heberlein; 1906–1988). Her father most notably served as Director of the Federal Department of Finance and as a member of the Executive Council (Direktorium) of the Swiss National Bank. She had two sisters; Marianne Gasser (née Iklé; 1935–2019) and Beatrix Hanslin (née Iklé; born 1944).

Her paternal family originally is of German Jewish descent from Hamburg. Her grandfather, Adolph Iklé (1852–1923), became a partner in the first machine embroidery company in Eastern Switzerland in 1880, which would turn into Iklé Frères which existed until 1929. Through her great-uncle Leopold Iklé, she is a second cousin of Fred Iklé, who served as under secretary of defense for policy during the Reagan Administration. Her maternal family belonged to the reformed bourgeoisie of St. Gallen, originally being from Braubach in Hesse-Nassau. Heberlein & Co. was the first company to produce mercerized yarns in Switzerland.

Kopp attended high school in Bern, some classes together with Linda Geiser and Mani Matter. In 1956, she began to study law at the University of Zurich, and joined the Swiss-Hungarian Student Relief Organisation (SDSU), which was founded due to the Hungarian Revolution. The SDSU leadership held meetings at the Villa of Kopps parents and they also spent vacations together in an estate of the Heberlein family in Malcesine at the Lake Garda. In 1960, she completed her studies with a Licentiate degree.

== Political career ==
=== Cantonal and legislative offices ===
In 1970, Elisabeth Kopp became a municipal councilor (Gemeinderat) of Zumikon, and in 1974 the first female president of a municipality in the canton of Zurich. In February 1971, just days ahead of the national women's suffrage referendum, she took part in a panel in the casino in Wohlen for the yes campaign. Between 1972 and 1979, she served on the executive council of the canton of Zürich as a representative for the FDP. For the FDP, Kopp was a candidate to the National Council in the Federal Elections of 1975 supported from the Women Central of Zurich and even though she was not elected, received an encouraging result. For the Federal Election of 1979, she campaigned focusing on her experience as the president of Zumikon. She would be elected with 52,113 votes. As a member of the FDP, she served in the National Council of Switzerland from 1979 to 1984. For the first seven sessions she mainly observed and only introduced one motion demanding from the Federal Council to examine the possibilities for encouraging saving.

==== Environmental politics ====
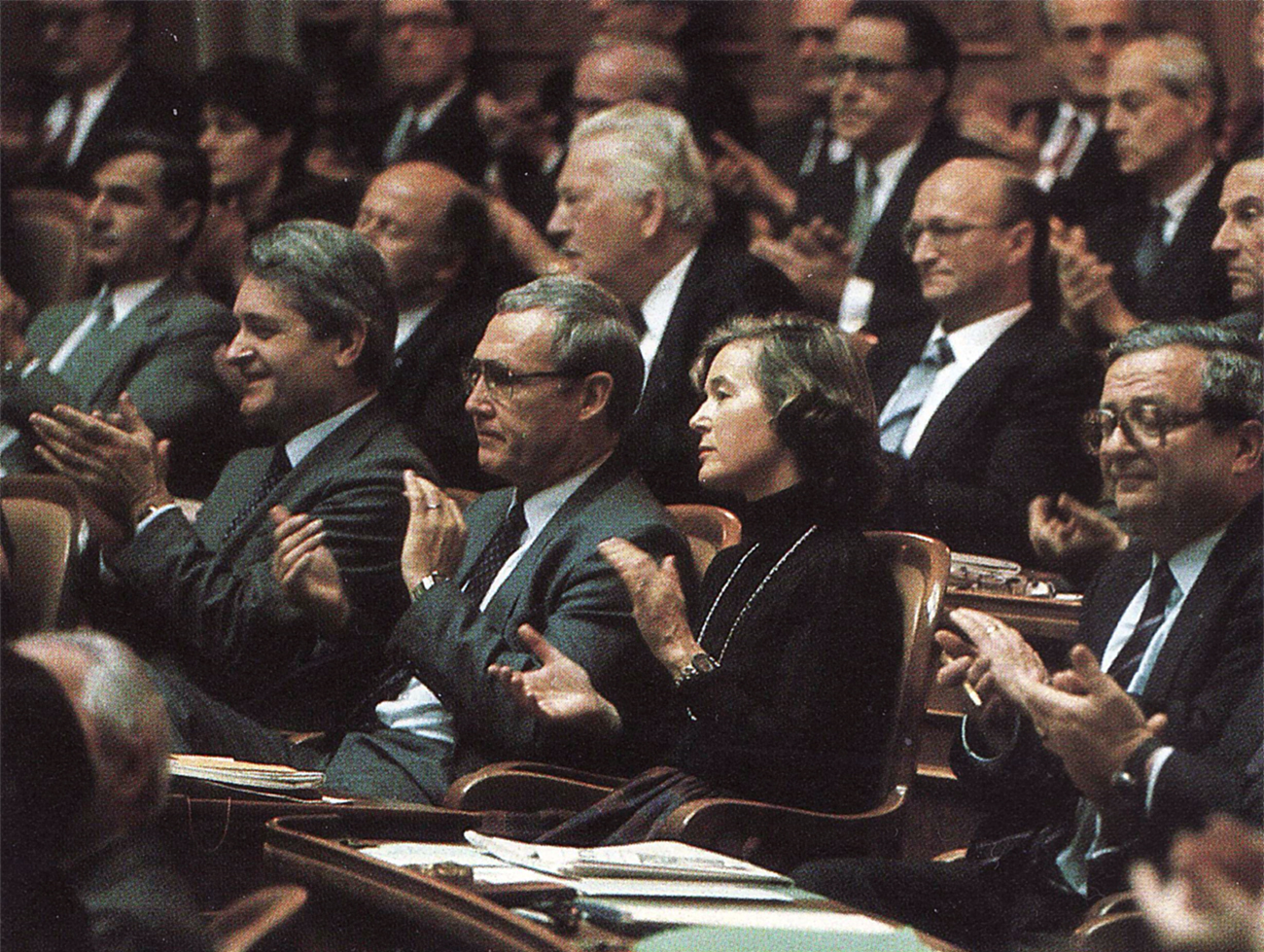
Elisabeth Kopp in the National Council

In a press conference in 1981, shortly after it was reported that the Federal Council would leave it with the status quo and not enforce tougher measurements, she demanded that the Federal Council fulfill Kurt Furgler's promise from 1977 to enforce tougher measurements for combustion engines in automobiles. This step was lauded by the media and she became known as an environmental politician. In fact, the press conference was organized by the World Wildlife Fund (WWF). The result was that a few days later the Federal Council decided not to impose the softer regulations ECE-Norm and supported the installation of a catalytic converter. From 1981 onwards until her election to the Federal Council she would focus on environmental politics. She joined the Swiss League for the Protection of Nature, the predecessor of Pro Natura. In environmental politics she chose to find her political positions independently, but usually with the support from prominent figures of her party. In other political questions she followed the party line.

==== Other political positions ====
She defended nuclear energy as a clean energy, campaigned for the expansion of the airport in Zurich or opposed federal scholarships and a 42-hour week for the federal services.

=== Federal Council ===
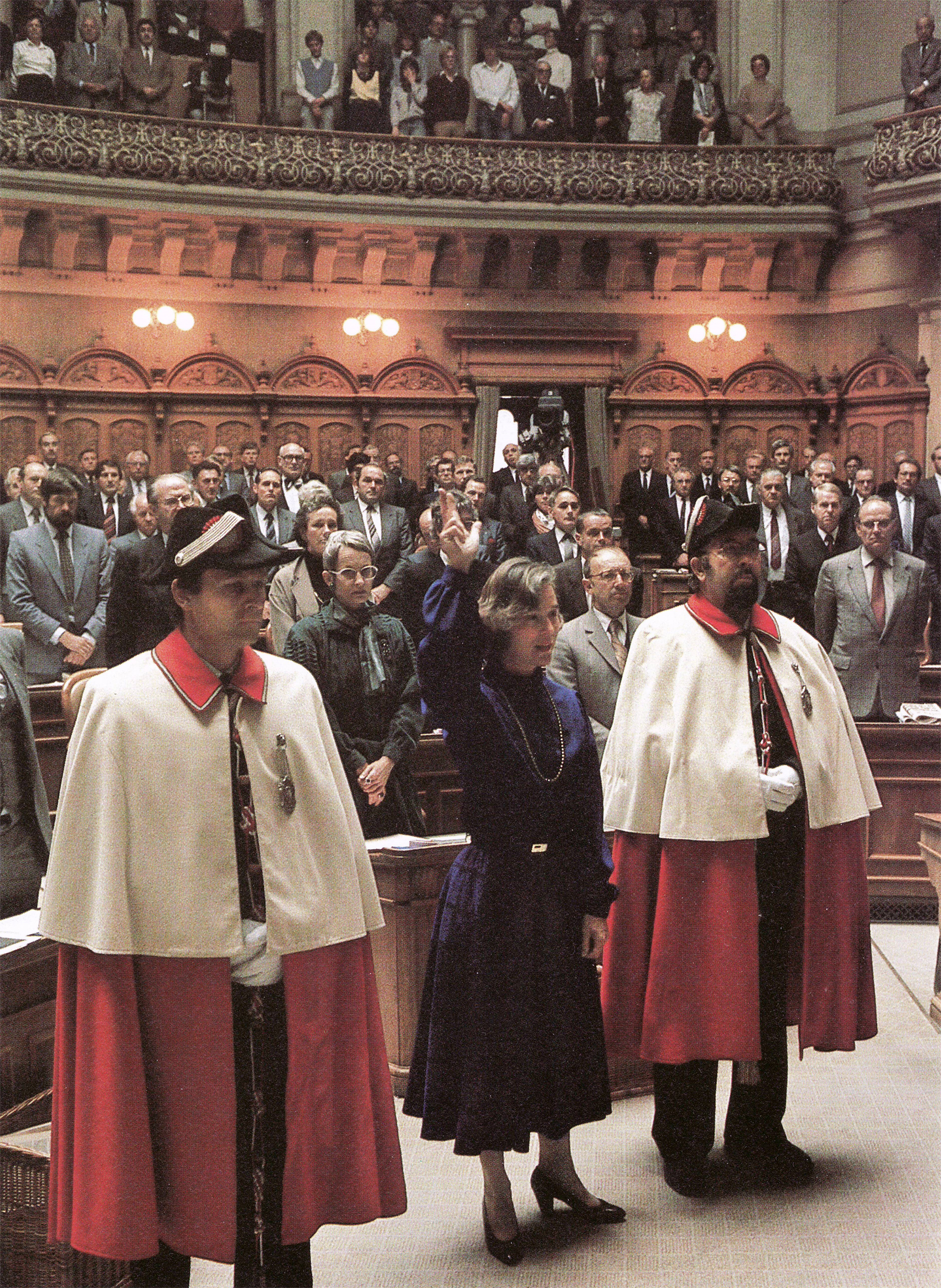
Kopp swearing in as a member of the Federal Council in 1984

In 1984, Federal Councillor Rudolf Friedrich resigned from his office for health reasons. The Free Democratic Party then nominated Elisabeth Kopp and Bruno Hunziker as Friedrich's successor.

On 2 October 1984, Kopp was elected to the Federal Council as the first woman ever in that office. She was elected with the first ballot, receiving 124 votes out of 244. As a Federal Councilor, she was the head of the Federal Department of Justice and Police (EJPD) and was elected as the vice president of the Confederation in December 1988. During her tenure, one of her focuses was the reform of the law for asylum seekers. For this she also created the post of the delegate for refugees. The reform was criticized by figures in the leftwing and christian society but it was eventually approved in a referendum in 1987. In the confirmation election of December 1987, several politicians from the green and left wing parties and the francophone part of Switzerland refused to re-elect her and she was confirmed with only 166 votes.

=== Scandal and resignation ===
Kopp's husband Hans W. Kopp was investigated by the authorities in Zurich over the bankruptcy of the investment company Trans K-B, of which he was the president of the board of directors. Following some pressure from the magazine Beobachter, the authorities investigated him for tax fraud. At the end of October 1989, Hans Kopp resigned from the Shakarchi Trading AG, for whom he served as the vice president of the board of directors.

On 5 November the newspaper Tages-Anzeiger reported on an investigation into money laundering by people associated with the Shakarchi Trading AG. It reported the suspicion that Kopp received a warning from his wife, the federal councilor, which she denied. On 9 December 1988, the Swiss newspaper Le Matin wrote about a phone call to her husband Hans Kopp. Elisabeth Kopp then confessed having made that call, which led to the Swiss media demanding her resignation. On 12 December 1988, Kopp announced that she would resign at the end of February 1989, insisting that she was without guilt in the matter. Pressure was raised again and Kopp finally announced her immediate resignation on 12 January 1989. Her resignation led to the imposition of a parliamentary investigative commission, headed by Moritz Leuenberger of the Social Democratic Party (SP). The commission was tasked not only to investigate her resignation but also the approach of the EJPD towards drug traffic and tax fraud.

In February Kaspar Villiger from the FDP was elected as her successor in the Federal Council. Her successor as vice president of the Federal Council was Arnold Koller. On 27 February 1989, the National Council voted to lift her immunity. In March 1989, the state prosecutor initiated an investigation against Elisabeth Kopp for breach of confidentiality. In February 1990, the court ruled that the information in question was classified, but it could not be determined if Kopp was aware of this.

== Personal life ==
In 1960, Elisabeth Iklé married Hans W. Kopp (1931–2009), who was an attorney and board member of several companies. They were introduced during a student excursion to West Berlin in 1959. They had one daughter;

- Brigitt Kopp (born 1963), who is married to Res Küttel, a secondary school teacher, and has three daughters; Nicole Küttel (born 1992), Flurina Küttel (born 1993), Alina Küttel (born 2000) and two grandchildren. Brigitt Küttel is an attorney, consultant and founder of stiftung.ch which is a consulting firm for nonprofits and private foundations.

After Elisabeth Kopp was elected to the National Council, her husband bought an apartment for her in Bern. After she was elected into the Federal Council, she had to move to another apartment due to security reasons. In Zumikon, the family Kopp lived on the estate Three Oaks on which she surrounded the villa with two biotopes, endangered plants and a waterfall powered by solar power. Elisabeth Kopp died on 7 April 2023, at age 86.

== Film ==
- Andres Brütsch: Elisabeth Kopp – Eine Winterreise (A Winter's Journey: Switzerland's First Female Minister), documentary, 85 min., Topic Film, January 2007

Political offices
Preceded by Rudolf Friedrich	Member of the Swiss Federal Council; 1984–1989	Succeeded by Kaspar Villiger
Preceded by Rudolf Friedrich	Minister of Justice and Police; 1984–1989	Succeeded by Arnold Koller
Preceded by Jean-Pascal Delamuraz	Vice President of Switzerland; 1989	Succeeded by Arnold Koller
