= Chemical finishing of textiles =

Chemical finishing methods that may alter the chemical properties of the treated fabrics

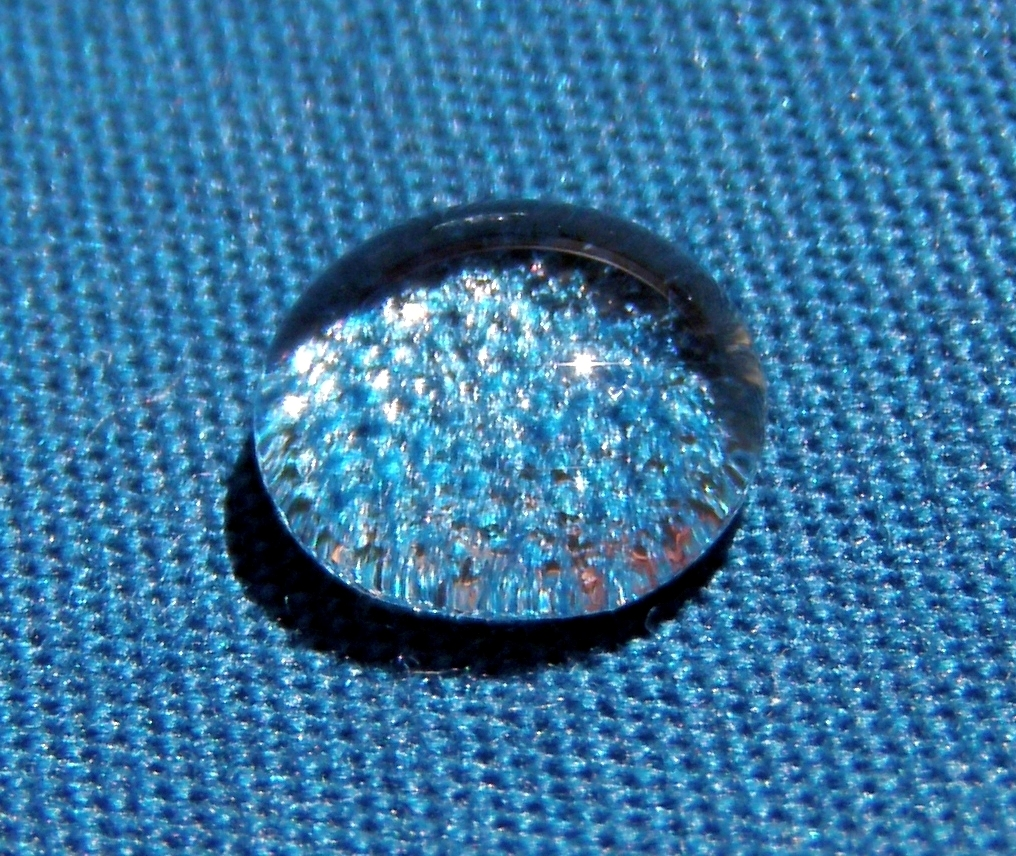
Fluorine-containing durable water repellent makes a fabric water-resistant.

Chemical finishing of textiles refers to the process of applying and treating textiles with a variety of chemicals in order to achieve desired functional and aesthetic properties. Textile finishing is the process by which these chemical applications, along with mechanical finishing treatments, convert woven or knitted cloth into usable material. Chemical finishing imparts a wide variety of properties such as waterproofing, wrinkle-resistance, and lasting sheen, among many others, to textiles according to the intended function of the final product.

== Finish ==
Textile finishing is the process of converting the loom state or raw goods into a useful product, which can be done mechanically or chemically. Finishing is a broad term that refers to a variety of physical and chemical techniques and treatments that finish one stage of textile production while also preparing for the next. Textile finishing can include aspects like improving surface feel, aesthetic enhancement, and adding advanced chemical finishes. A finish is any process that transforms unfinished products into finished products. This includes mechanical finishing and chemical applications which alter the composition of treated textiles (fiber, yarn or fabric.)

== Mechanical finishes ==
Mechanical finish refers to machine finishes such as embossing, heat setting, Sanforizing, shearing, luster imparting, surface finishes, and glaze finishes.

Mechanical finishes
Raised surface finishes	Luster imparting	Glaze and design
Gigging	Calendering	Embossing
Napping	Beetling	Moire
Sueding		
Flocking		

== Chemical finishes ==
Chemical finishes are chemicals that may alter the properties of the treated fabrics. Finishes may vary from aesthetic to special purposes. Examples of chemical finishes are:

- Fabric softeners impart soft hand feel to the treated fabrics.
- Silk surfacing a surface finishing of cotton to obtain an appearance similar to silk.
- Plissé is chemical finish in which the fabrics are treated with sodium hydroxide to obtain a puckering effect.
- Deweighting, or weight reduction, is a treatment for polyester to make it like silk. The treatment peels the surface and reduces the fiber weight and strength while making them softer and finer. Additionally, the treatment enhances the absorbency of the treated substrates.

=== Purpose ===
Finishing makes the textiles attractive and more useful. The finishing process adds essential properties to the treated textiles and enhances the serviceability of the products.

Serviceability in textiles includes aesthetics, comfort, durability, care and protection attributes.

=== Performance chemical finishes ===
"Special purpose finishes" or ''performance finishes'' improve the performance of textiles for a specific end-use. Performance finishes are not a new concept; oilcloth is the first known coated fabric. Boiled linseed oil is used to make oilcloth. Boiled oils have been used from the year 200 AD. Performance finishing contributes to a variety of areas. The following are some examples of special-purpose finishes:

- Flame retardant finishes based on inorganic, organophosphorus, halogenated organic and nitrogen-based compounds make the treated fabric fire retarding; i.e., the fabric inhibits or suppresses the combustion process to improve safety.
- Durable water repellent finishes provide water repellancy to the treated fabrics.
- Wrinkle-resistant fabrics are treated fabrics with wrinkle-free finishes.
- In manufacturing of pristine clothes.
- Self cleaning fabrics with lotus effect.
- Medical textiles are endowed with protecting properties such as body fluid resistance and an antimicrobial surface for use in personal protective equipment including aprons, coverall and gowns for healthcare workers treating infectious diseases such as COVID-19.
- Coated fabrics are used for transportation, industrial application, geotextile, and military use.

== Application ==
Chemical finishes can be applied in three different ways: exhaust applications, coating, and padding.

=== Coating ===
The coating is an application of chemical substances on the surface of fabric that is to be made functional or decorative. Coating is attained by applying a thin layer of a functional chemical, compound, or polymer on the substrate's surface. Coatings use less material than other types of applications, such as exhaust or padding.

==== Nanomaterials ====
Advances in chemical finishes include application of nanomaterials.

== Chemical hazards ==
Certain chemical finishes contain potential hazards to health and the environment. Perfluorinated acids are considered to be hazardous to human health by the US Environmental Protection Agency.

Name of the substance	Advantage in textile products	Associated health risks and environmental impacts	References
Perfluorooctanoic acid ( PFOA), Polytetrafluoroethylene (Teflon)	Hydrophobic effect	Endocrine disruptor	
Fluorocarbon (PFC)	Hydrophobic effect	May cause respiratory illness	
Bromine	Brominated flame retardant	Persistent, bioaccumulative and toxic substances may cause neurobehavioral disorders and endocrine disruption	
Silver, silver nanoparticle	Antimicrobial resistance	Environmental impact of silver nanoparticles and toxic effects on human health	

== See also ==
- Wet process engineering
- Performance (textiles)
