= Fred Iklé =

Swiss-American sociologist and national defense expert (1924-2011)

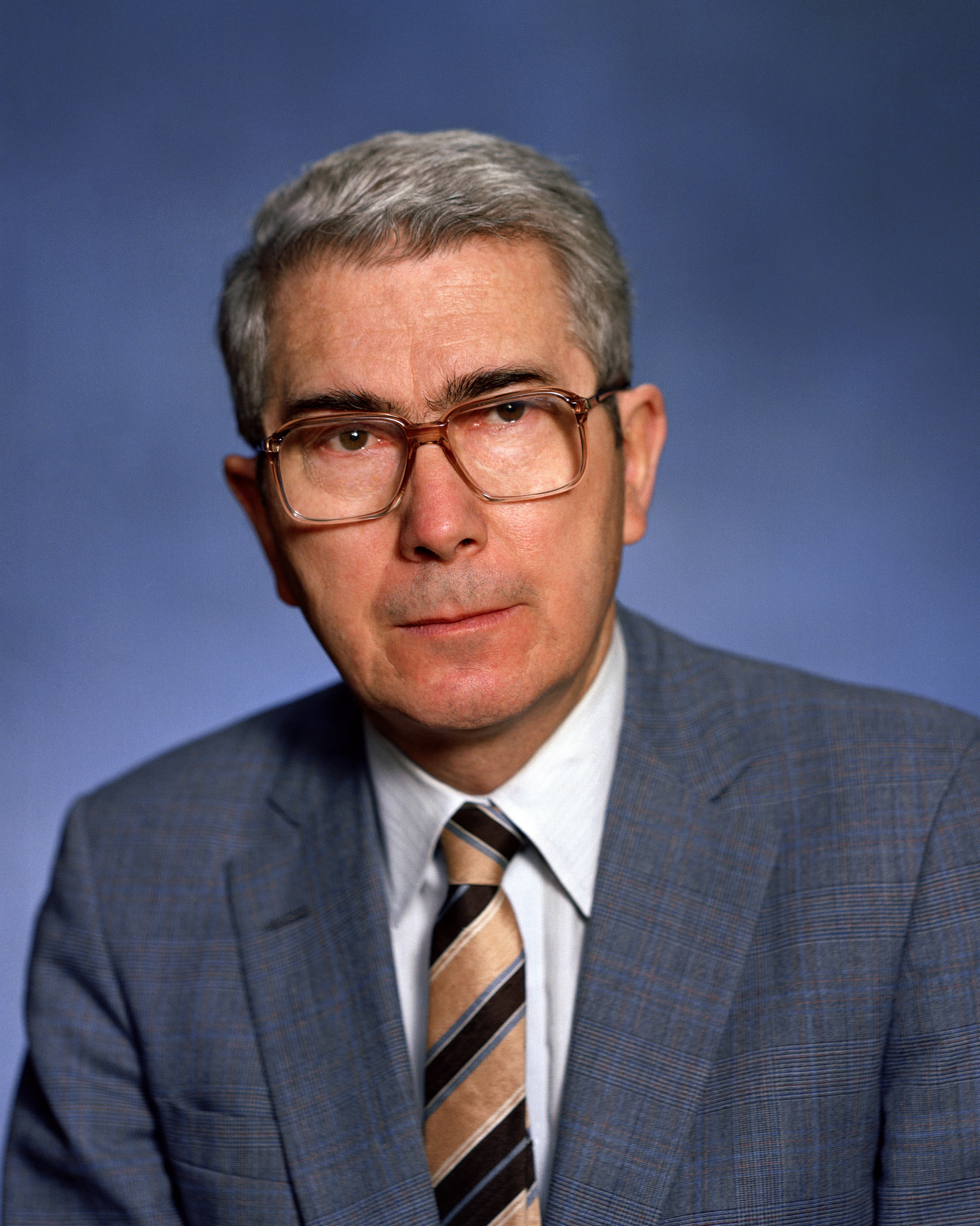
- Fred Iklé in 1983

Under Secretary of Defense for Policy
- In office April 2, 1981 – February 19, 1988
- President: Ronald Reagan
- Preceded by: Robert Komer
- Succeeded by: Paul Wolfowitz

Director of the Arms Control and Disarmament Agency
- In office July 10, 1973 – January 19, 1977
- President: Richard Nixon; Gerald Ford
- Preceded by: Gerard C. Smith
- Succeeded by: Paul Warnke

Personal details
- Born: Fritz Karl Iklé; August 21, 1924 Samedan, Switzerland
- Died: November 10, 2011 (aged 87) Bethesda, Maryland, U.S.
- Relatives: Elisabeth Kopp (second cousin)
- Education: University of Zurich (BA); University of Chicago (MA, PhD)

Fred Charles Iklé (né Fritz Karl Iklé; August 21, 1924 – November 10, 2011) was a Swiss-American sociologist and defense expert. Iklé's expertise was in defense and foreign policy, nuclear strategy, and the role of technology in the emerging international order. After a career in academia (including a professorship at MIT) he was appointed director of the Arms Control and Disarmament Agency in 1973–1977, before becoming Under Secretary of Defense for Policy (1981 to 1988). He was later a member of the Council on Foreign Relations and the Department of Defense's Defense Policy Board Advisory Committee, a Distinguished Scholar with the Center for Strategic and International Studies (CSIS) and a Director of the National Endowment for Democracy.

Iklé is credited with a key role in increasing U.S. aid to anti-Soviet rebels in the Soviet–Afghan War. He successfully proposed and promoted the idea of supplying the rebels with anti-aircraft Stinger missiles, overcoming CIA opposition.

Iklé was a second cousin of Elisabeth Kopp, the first woman in the Swiss Federal Council, elected in 1984.

== Early life and education ==
Iklé was born Fritz Karl Iklé on August 21, 1924, in Samedan, Switzerland, the youngest of four children, to Friedrich Arnold Iklé (1877–1946) and Maria Hedwig Iklé (née Huber). He is of German Jewish descent through his paternal grandfather, Leopold Iklé, who hailed from Hamburg and became a citizen in St. Gallen, operating Iklé Brothers trading in silk and embroidery. Through this family connection he is a second cousin of Elisabeth Kopp (née Iklé) who was a member of the Federal Council (Switzerland).

He anglicized his name after moving to the United States in 1946. He earned a degree at the University of Zurich with a master's and doctorate from the University of Chicago (1948 and 1950), both in sociology. His doctorate involved research in Dresden and Nagasaki and led to a book, The Social Impact of Bomb Destruction, (1958).

In 1962, Iklé was cited in a bestselling American novel on the risks of accidental nuclear war, Fail-Safe, as an example of one of "the right people" whose warnings should have been heeded: "...for years there has been a fellow named Fred Iklé, who has been working with the Rand Corporation and the Air Force on how to reduce war by accident. He has found flaw after flaw in the system, at just the same time that the newspapers were saying it was perfect." From 1964 to 1967 Iklé was a professor in political science at the Massachusetts Institute of Technology. As well as Rand, Iklé was also at Harvard University's Weatherhead Center for International Affairs, where he met Henry Kissinger, who in 1973 (while serving as Richard Nixon's national security advisor) recruited Iklé to government service.

== Career ==
From 1973 to 1977 Iklé served as director of the U.S. Arms Control and Disarmament Agency. After the election of Ronald Reagan in 1980, Iklé was appointed Under Secretary of Defense for Policy, serving from 1981 to 1988.

=== Under Secretary of Defense ===
As an under secretary of defense, Iklé led the effort to lobby for National Security Decision Directive 166 ("Expanded US Aid to Afghan Guerrillas"), signed by Reagan in March 1985. When he visited Pakistan in April 1985, Iklé found that the CIA was still pursuing the war in a halfhearted manner. "We began to understand that what to us was a very big deal back in Washington, from the point of view of the president, is a second order priority handled by one GS [civil service officer]," according to Michael Pillsbury, Iklé's deputy.

Iklé sponsored a proposal to supply the rebels with Stinger shoulder-fired anti-aircraft missiles. The Stinger proposal was at first strongly opposed by the CIA, the U.S. State Department, and the Joint Chiefs of Staff. CIA Deputy Director John McMahon, who resisted the proposal, was the target of a letter-writing campaign by conservative groups. At a meeting on December 6, 1985, Iklé asked McMahon if the CIA needed Stingers. "I decided then and there that I had enough of carrying water for the Joint Chiefs and I said 'Fred, I'll take every Stinger you can send me,'" McMahon recalled. Despite McMahon's apparent change of heart, the CIA again vetoed the Stinger proposal at an interagency meeting in mid-February 1986. President Reagan signed an executive order to supply the Angolan guerrilla group UNITA with Stingers on February 18, and the CIA finally agreed to supply them to the Afghan rebels on February 23.

== Later life ==
Iklé remained at the Defense Department until 1988, when he joined the Center for Strategic and International Studies (CSIS). Iklé served as a Commissioner on the National Commission on Terrorism, which produced the Report of the National Commission on Terrorism in June 2000, and he served for nine years as Director of the National Endowment for Democracy.

He also co-chaired the bipartisan Commission on Integrated Long-Term Strategy, which published Discriminate Deterrence in January 1988. In 1975 and 1987, Iklé received the highest civilian award of the Department of Defense, the Medal for Distinguished Public Service. In 1988, he was awarded the Bronze Palm.

Iklé served as chairman of the Board of the Telos Corporation and as a director of the Zurich-American Insurance Companies. He was a Director of CMC Energy Services and served as Governor of the Smith Richardson Foundation and as a Director of the U.S. Committee for Human Rights in North Korea.

He was a founding signatory of the Project for the New American Century's 1997 "statement of principles."

He was the author of several books and numerous articles on defense, foreign policy, and arms control, including How Nations Negotiate and Every War Must End.

== Personal life ==
On December 23, 1959, Iklé married Doris Margaret Eisemann (1928–2012), an economist of German Jewish origins. They had two daughters together;

- Judith Iklé (b.c. 1960s), who married Aaron Maizlish, a businessman of San Francisco, California. Two children; Leo Iklé-Maizlish (b.c. 2000) and Anna Iklé-Maizlish (b.c. 2004)
- Miriam Iklé-Khalsa (b.c. 1960s), who married Sat Jiwan Iklé-Khalsa. One daughter; Kyah S. Iklé-Khalsa (born April 6, 2007). Both of Takoma Park, Maryland.

Iklé died in Bethesda, Maryland on November 10, 2011.

== Awards ==
- the Department of Defense's Medal for Distinguished Public Service (1987)
- the Bronze Palm (1988)
- the National Endowment for Democracy's Democracy Service Medal (2001).

== Published works ==
- Annihilation From Within (Columbia University Press, 2006)
- Every War Must End (Columbia University Press, 1971, 1991, 2005 with new prefaces)
- How Nations Negotiate (Harper and Row, 1968)
- The Social Impact of Bomb Destruction (University of Oklahoma Press, 1958)

Diplomatic posts
Preceded by Gerard C. Smith	Director of the Arms Control and Disarmament Agency; 1973–1977	Succeeded by Paul Warnke
Political offices
Preceded by Robert Komer	Under Secretary of Defense for Policy; 1981–1988	Succeeded by Paul Wolfowitz
