= Surface contour =

Fiber characteristic that describes surface of the fiber

The surface contour of the fiber characterizes its outer surface along its shaft and may be rough, smooth, scaly, serrated, convoluted, or striated, all of which contribute to the friction, softness, and texture. The property is important for the texture and feel of the fabric that is made. Natural fibers, like cotton and wool, have a staple length and irregular, void-filled surface contours. The rough surface aids in the capture of fine particles. Due to the fact that they are not completely solid, they are more compressible. The fiber's microstructures include its cross section shape and surface contour.

== Shapes of fibers ==
Fiber contour is defined by the fiber's longitudinal surface form. The surface shape of the fiber varies from fiber to fiber which is inherent in natural fibers and may be altered and controlled at the manufacturing stage of synthetic fibers.

The fiber shape of synthetic fibers is controlled with a device spinneret during manufacturing (extrusion) process, whereas natural fibers conceive their shape with a variety of factors such as cellulose built up in plant fibers, and in silk, the shape of orifice from where the silk fibers are extruded. In hair fibers, it is hair follicle that is responsible for the shape.

== Significance ==
The process by which fibers become yarns and yarns become fabric results in fabric structure and its properties. Other than the hand feel and texture of the fabric, the frictional properties of the fibers and comfort to the skin are properties of the fabric that depend upon the surface contour.

== See also ==
- Aesthetics (textile)
- Textile performance
- Synthetic fiber
- Natural fiber
