= Trilobal =

Shape with three distinct sides

In fibers, trilobal is a cross-section shape with three distinct sides. The shape is advantageous for optical reflective properties and is used in textile fibers. Silk fibers' rounded edges and triangular cross section contribute to their luster; in some cases, synthetic fibers are manufactured to mimic this trilobal shape to give them a silk-like appearance. Filaments with a round cross section have less brilliance than trilobal filaments.

== Etymology ==
The dictionary definition of Trilobal at Wiktionary is a combination of the words "Tri" for three and "lobal" for sides.

== Objective ==
The trilobal shape helps in altering the hand and increasing the luster. Many synthetic fibres, such as polyester and nylon, are manufactured in Trilobal cross sectional shape for the purpose of enhancing the brilliance and changing the handle. Luster adds aesthetic values in fabrics, contributes to their attractiveness. Occasionally, this adds value to their quality assessment.

== Use ==
Synthetic fibers are particularly suitable for specific effects such as crimping and texturizing due to their adaptability during production. A trilobal cross section helps alter texture and several physical attributes such as strength and static properties, in addition to providing brightness to the fibres. The trilobal cross sectional shape helps to reduce manufacturing defects in filaments.

== See also ==
- Fiber
