= Moynihan Commission on Government Secrecy =

The Commission on Protecting and Reducing Government Secrecy, also called the Moynihan Commission, after its chairman, U.S. Senator Daniel Patrick Moynihan, was a bipartisan statutory commission in the United States. It was created under Title IX of the Foreign Relations Authorization Act for Fiscal Years 1994 and 1995 (P.L. 103-236 SEC. 900) to conduct "an investigation into all matters in any way related to any legislation, executive order, regulation, practice, or procedure relating to classified information or granting security clearances" and to submit a final report with recommendations. The Commission's investigation of government secrecy was the first authorized by statute since the Wright Commission on Government Security issued its report in 1957.

The Commission issued its unanimous final report on March 3, 1997.

A major effect of the commission was the declassification of the Venona project.

== Key findings ==
The Commission's key findings were:

- Secrecy is a form of government regulation.
- Excessive secrecy has significant consequences for the national interest when policy makers are not fully informed, the government is not held accountable for its actions, and the public cannot engage in informed debate.
- Some secrecy is important to minimize inappropriate diffusion of details of weapon systems design and ongoing security operations as well as to allow public servants to secretly consider a variety of policy options without fear of criticism.
- The best way to ensure that secrecy is respected, and that the most important secrets remain secret, is for secrecy to be returned to its limited but necessary role. Secrets can be protected more effectively if secrecy is reduced overall.
- Apart from aspects of nuclear energy subject to the Atomic Energy Act, secrets in the federal government are whatever anyone with a stamp decides to stamp secret. This inevitably produces problems where even the president of the United States may make mistakes that might have been avoided with a more open system.
- A new statute is needed to set forth the principles for what may be declared secret.

Senator Moynihan reported that approximately 400,000 new secrets are created annually at the highest level, Top Secret. That level is defined by law as applying to any secret that, were it to become public, would cause "exceptionally grave damage to the national security."^{1} In 1994, it was estimated that the United States government had over 1.5 billion pages of classified material that were at least 25 years old.

In 1995 President Bill Clinton's Executive Order 12958 updated the national security classification and declassification system. This Executive Order established a system to automatically declassify information more than 25 years old, unless the government took discrete steps to continue the classification of a particular document or group of documents.

== Members ==
- Daniel Patrick Moynihan, Chairman.
- Larry Combest, Vice Chairman; Congressman from the 19th district of Texas.
- John M. Deutch, former CIA director.
- Martin C. Faga, former director of the National Reconnaissance Office and Assistant Secretary of the Air Force for Space.
- Alison B. Fortier, director of missile defense programs in the Washington Operations Office of the Space and Strategic Missiles Sector of Lockheed Martin Corporation.
- Richard K. Fox, career foreign service officer in the U.S. Department of State.
- Lee H. Hamilton, ranking Democratic member of the House International Relations Committee.
- Jesse Helms, former chairman of the Senate Committee on Foreign Relations.
- Ellen Hume, executive director of PBS's Democracy Project.
- Samuel P. Huntington, Harvard professor, director of the John M. Olin Institute for Strategic Studies and chairman of the Harvard Academy for International and Area Studies; author of the Clash of Civilizations.
- John Podesta, Clinton White House Deputy Chief of Staff.
- Maurice Sonnenberg, member of the President's Foreign Intelligence Advisory Board (PFIAB).

== Cold War secrecy ==
The commission's findings regarding government secrecy in the early Cold War period have led to a reevaluation of many public perceptions regarding the period. By 1950, the United States government was in possession of information which the American public did not know: proof of a serious attack on American security by the Soviet Union, with considerable assistance from an enemy within. Soviet authorities knew the U.S. government knew. Only the American people were denied this information.^{2}

One revelation of the Venona project intercepts is that many Americans who spied for the Soviet Union were never prosecuted. To do so the government would have had to reveal what it knew.^{3} On 29 May 1946, Federal Bureau of Investigation (FBI) Director J. Edgar Hoover sent a high administration official a memorandum reporting "an enormous Soviet espionage ring in Washington." Undersecretary of State Dean Acheson was (falsely) at the top of the list. Truman distrusted Hoover and suspected him of playing political games. Acheson's inclusion at the top of the list automatically discredited other accusations which were on target, Alger Hiss and Nathan Gregory Silvermaster. In late August or early September 1947, the Army Security Agency informed the FBI it had begun to break into Soviet espionage messages. Truman had never been told of the existence of the Venona project, and always insisted Republicans had trumped up the loyalty issue for political gain.

The prosecutors in the internal-security cases of the 1940s did not know they had not been given all, or even the best government evidence, against the Rosenbergs, and others. The Venona project materials would have been conclusive in establishing the cast of characters in the Soviet spy networks.^{5} Government secrecy allowed critics of the Rosenberg and Hiss cases to construct elaborate theories about frame-ups and cover-ups. For years the Rosenbergs' defenders demanded that the government reveal its secrets about the case. When the Secrecy Commission forced the disclosure of documents, the secrets revealed the government's case was even stronger.^{6} "Over the years," said Ronald Radosh, "the Rosenbergs' defenders have loudly demanded the release of government documents on the case, only to deny the documents' significance once they are made public."^{7} As archives of the Cold War are opened, the original case made against Soviet espionage in the United States has received ever more conclusive corroboration.^{8}

== Loyalty ==
There is much information within a bureaucracy which could be used to injure the government or the national interest if revealed by disloyal persons to hostile nations or, for that matter, to hostile internal elements. It appears that the three-tiered gradation of today, Confidential / Secret / Top Secret, was adopted by the U.S. military from British forces in France in 1917, and was institutionalized with the Espionage Act of 1917. The U.S. Civil Service Commission, established by the Pendleton Act in 1883, was debarring persons relating to "loyalty" as late as 1921.

The Commission Report quotes Max Weber,

Every bureaucracy seeks to increase the superiority of the professionally informed by keeping their knowledge and intentions secret...Bureaucracy naturally welcomes a poorly informed and hence a powerless parliament—at least insofar as ignorance somehow agrees with the bureaucracy's interests.^{11}

In March 1947 President Truman issued Executive Order 9835, establishing the Federal Employee Loyalty Program, providing uniform investigation standards and procedures, and authorizing the creation of Loyalty Review Boards across the Government. The Truman Order—based on the findings of an interdepartmental committee established in 1946—was superseded by President Dwight D. Eisenhower's issuance of Executive Order 10450 in April 1953, which provided that "[t]he appointment of each civilian officer or employee in any department or agency of the Government shall be made subject to an investigation," and made each agency head responsible for ensuring that "the employment and retention in employment of any civilian officer or employee within the department or agency is clearly consistent with the interests of the national security." While abolishing the Truman Order program, including the Loyalty Review Boards within the Civil Service Commission, the new Order also made clear that "the interests of national security require that all persons privileged to be employed in the departments and agencies of the Government, shall be reliable, trustworthy, of good conduct and character, and of complete and unswerving loyalty to the United States."

In this manner, a broader "security" program was established across the Government. The political pressure had increased with the passage of legislation in 1950 "[t]o protect the national security of the United States by permitting the summary suspension of employment of civilian officers and employees of various departments and agencies." In addition, beginning in March 1948, the Attorney General's List was published on a regular basis—with members of organizations included on such a list to be denied employment in the federal government or defense industries as well as the right to a U.S. passport. During the 1952 presidential campaign, Dwight D. Eisenhower promised to root out communists and other security risks from government and defense industry employment— suggesting that their presence had been tolerated too easily by the Truman administration despite the existence of rules to address "loyalty" concerns. In his first State of the Union address Eisenhower promised a new system "for keeping out the disloyal and the dangerous." Executive Order 10450 soon followed. Senator Joseph McCarthy praised the new Executive Order. The New York Times reported, "The new program will require a new investigation of many thousands of employees previously investigated, as well as many more thousands who have had no security check."

In November 1953, Attorney General Herbert Brownell would allege in a speech that Truman had nominated a Soviet spy—senior Treasury Department official Harry Dexter White—to serve as the U.S. Executive Director of the International Monetary Fund, despite what Brownell said was the President's awareness of White's involvement in Soviet espionage. And on December 3, 1953, President Eisenhower directed that a "blank wall be placed between Dr. J. Robert Oppenheimer and secret data"—marking the beginning of the process that led to the Atomic Energy Commission's suspension of Oppenheimer's security clearance later in December and its 4-to-1 decision on June 28, 1954, against restoring the clearance.^{12}

== Notes ==
- ^1 Testimony of Senator Daniel Patrick Moynihan, Committee on Governmental Affairs, United States Senate Hearing on Government Secrecy, 7 May 1997.
- ^2 Moynihan Commission on Government Secrecy, Appendix A, The Cold War (1997).
- ^3 Moynihan Commission on Government Secrecy, Appendix A, The Experience of The Bomb (1997).
- ^4 Moynihan Commission on Government Secrecy, Chairmans Forward (1997).
- ^5 Daniel Patrick Moynihan, Secrecy: The American Experience, (New Haven: Yale University Press 1998), pg. 54.
- ^6 Ibid, pg. 62.
- ^7 Ronald Radosh and Joyce Milton, The Rosenberg File, 2d ed. (New Haven: Yale University Press, 1997), pgs. 471–72.
- ^8 Moynihan, Secrecy, pg. 52.
- ^9 Ibid, pg. 62.
- ^10 Moynihan Commission on Government Secrecy, Appendix A, Loyalty (1997).
- ^11 Max Weber, Essays in Sociology, trans. and ed. H.H. Gerth and C. Wright Mills (New York: Oxford University Press, 1946), 233–34; Wirtschaft und Gesellschaft (Economy and Society), 1922.
- ^12 Moynihan Commission on Government Secrecy, Appendix A, A Culture of Secrecy (1997).
