= Cross section (fiber) =

Shape of textile fibers from cross sectional view

The cross section depicts the shape of the various textile fibers. Each textile fiber offers a distinct cross sectional appearance when seen under a microscope. The shapes vary from round to oval and flat, different shapes determines certain characteristics of the textiles. Though the majority of synthetic fibers have a circular cross section, but the shape could be altered or engineered during the manufacturing process. The cross-sectional shape is responsible for certain physical properties of textile fibers such as the luster of textiles.

== Significance ==
The cross section of a fiber has an effect on the appearance, hand, drape, flexibility, and moisture wicking properties. The cross sectional shape or form of the fibers specifies their texture. Numerous physical characteristics such as hand, bulkiness, and luster are associated with cross sectional shape. Synthetic fibers with a more regular surface seem brighter than natural fibers with an irregular surface, with the exception of silk, which has a regular surface.

Different shapes have their own significance; for example, the trilobal cross section contributes several physical properties to the fibres, including strength and static properties, in addition to providing brightness. Furthermore, the trilobal cross sectional shape of filament aids in the reduction of manufacturing defects.

== Shapes ==
Textile fibers come in a variety of shapes and forms. The fiber shape of synthetic fibers is controlled with a device spinneret during manufacturing (extrusion) process, whereas natural fibers conceive their shape with a variety of factors such as cellulose built up in plant fibers, and in silk, the shape of orifice from where the silk fibers are extruded. In hair fibers, it is hair follicle that is responsible for the shape.

Shape of fibers and characteristics
Shape	Characteristics of the fiber
Oval or round	Smooth, soft and slippery feel, reflectance value high, poor covering properties.
Dog bone	Feels harsher than round shaped fibers, high luster, covering properties excellent.
Flat	Reflection of light is higher than that of a round shape.
Trilobal	Trilobal fibers have three sides, they feel like silk fibers and reflection of light is higher than that round shaped fibers.
Pentalobal	Pentalobal is a structure resembling a five-sided star. The Pentalobal shaped fibre imparts a subtle sheen and bulkiness.
Octolobal	Octolobal, a shape with compressed hexagons. The fibers with Octolobal shape have subdued luster. Flatter sides reflect or disperse the light.
Multilobal	Multilobal, a fibre shape characterised by a large number of pentalobal lobes. Each lobe reflects light in some way.

== See also ==
- Aesthetics (textile)
- Textile performance
- Surface contour (fiber)
