= Bruno Hunziker =

Swiss politician (1930–2000)

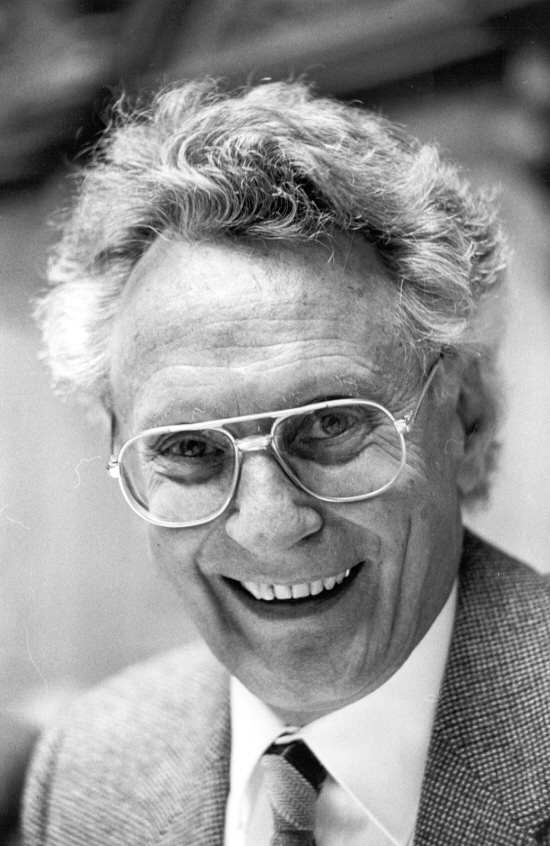
Portrait of the Swiss politician, Bruno Hunziker

Bruno Hunziker (10 February 1930, in Winterthur – 27 March 2000, in Aarau) was a Swiss attorney, politician, and member of the Aargau canton and Swiss federal parliaments.

== Early life ==
Bruno Hunziker was a citizen of Oberkulm and Aarau and was raised in Möhlin, Switzerland. After studying law in Basel, he engaged in local law from 1957 to 1968.

== Canton Politics ==
Bruno Hunziker was a member of Aargau's canton parliament (the Grand Council), 1965–1968. Bruno Hunziker was head of the canton's construction department in 1968 and then, from 1969–1976, the health department. During his tenure in the health department, the Swiss Hospital Institute was founded in Aarau and Bruno Hunziker became its first president. He was twice president of the Aargau canton government (1 April 1970 – 31 March 1971, 1 February 1976 – 31 March 1976).

== Federal Politics ==
Bruno was a member of both houses of the Swiss parliament, the National Council (1977–1987) and the Council of States (1987–1991). In 1984, Rudolf Friedrich resigned from the Federal Council. The Free Democratic Party then nominated Elisabeth Kopp and Bruno Hunziker. Although Hunziker was expected to handily win, on 2 Oct 1894 with 124 of 244 votes, Kopp became the first woman elected to the Federal Council. The FDP may have wished to appease the Green Party which preferred the stringent emissions standards of Zurich, Kopp's base. Bruno Hunziker was president of the Free Democratic Party of Switzerland from 1984 to 1989.
