= Parchmentising =

Textile finishing treatment

Parchmentising or parchmentizing is an aesthetic finish for textiles. It is a finishing treatment for cellulose fabric that stiffens the fabric and imparts a degree of translucency.

== Parchment ==
Parchment was a material for writing created in ancient times. It was created with animal skin. It means "stuff from Pergamos" in both the Latin and Greek language. Eumenes II developed parchment when papyrus was banned for export to Pergamos by Ptolemy V Epiphanes. The skin of sheep, goats, or cattle was used to create parchment. The parchmentising process involves the application of sulfuric acid to cellulosic textiles in order to achieve the characteristics of parchment.

== Organdy ==
Parchmentising offers a stiffened and somewhat translucent finish. Organdy is one of the sheerest cloths produced by the process.

== Development ==
Parchmentising was described in 1850 by John Mercer, who treated cotton with solutions of 110–125 °Tw sulfuric acid, at room temperature, followed by washing. Mercer observed that the treated fabric was soft like fine wool when treated at 110 °Tw, shrank and stiffened at 114 °Tw, or shrank, stiffened, and became semi-transparent from 116 to 125 °Tw.

In general, treating indefinitely with concentrations below 110 °Tw (64%) only swells and shrinks the fabric, while higher concentrations produce the stiff, translucent parchment-like effect in a few seconds, with some loss of tensile strength.

Textile makers have combined sulfuric acid treatment with other processes to achieve different effects. For example, Mercerising cotton fabric before acid treatment appears to make it more susceptible to treatment at lower concentrations of sulfuric acid. At about 106 °Tw the Mercerised lustre is removed and the fabric becomes fuller, softer, and more wool-like, similar to a crêpe. The parchmentising effect is still present at higher concentrations, and may be obtained as low as 107.5 °Tw with somewhat longer treatment, perhaps a few minutes. Acid and alkaline treatments are sometimes applied several times in alternation, and patterns may be created by locally applying a resist before or between treatments.

At every stage the treatment is stopped by washing and neutralizing the fabric. After acid treatment and washing, a heavy calender, sometimes heated, can be applied to the wet or dried fabric to vary its translucency.
