= Hand feel =

Feel of the fabrics to the skin or hand

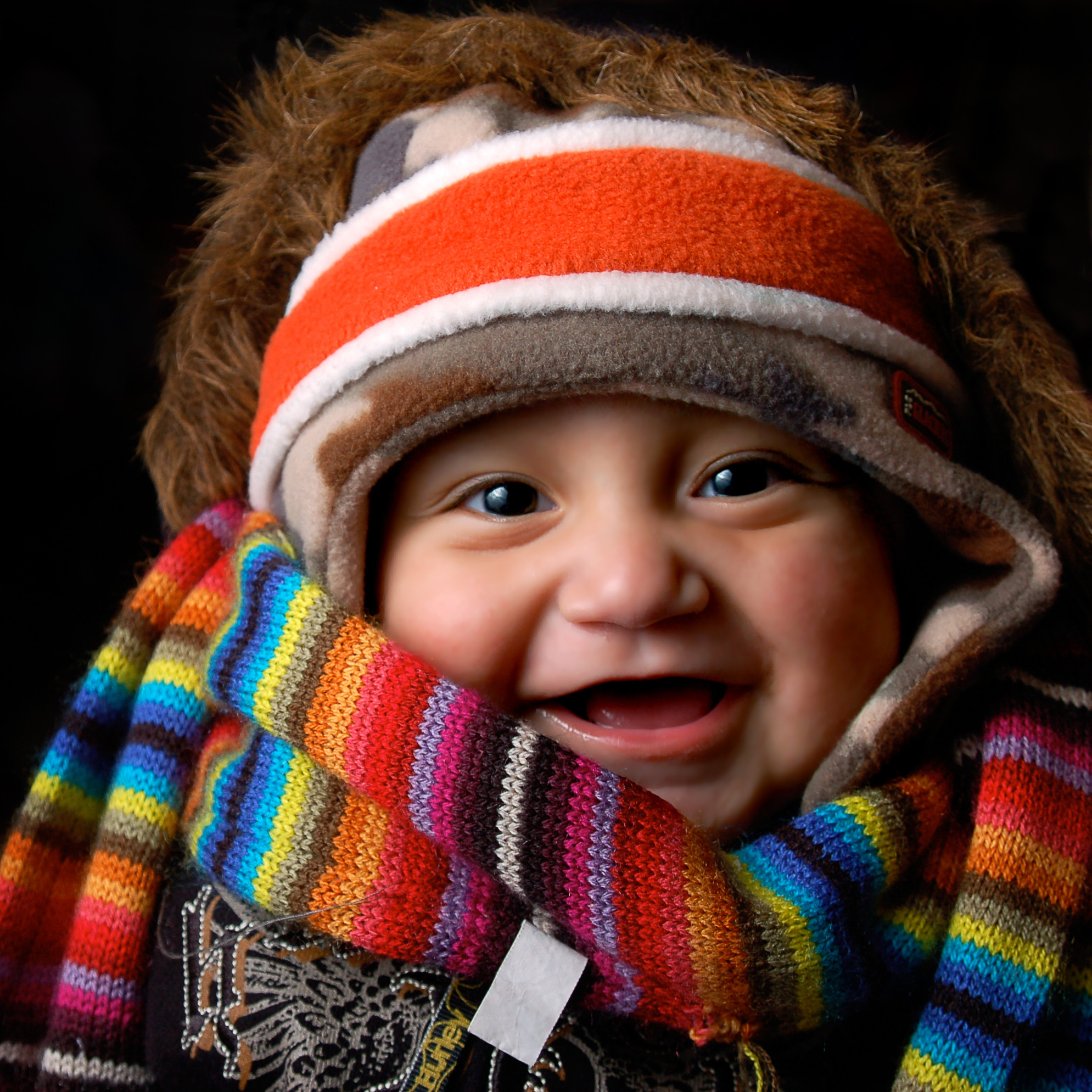
A baby wearing many items of soft winter clothing: headband, cap, fur-lined coat, scarf and sweater

Hand feel, handle, fabric hand, or fabric feel refers to the tactile impression a fabric creates when held or touched by an individual. It determines the various sensory perceptions associated with the clothing material assessed, including softness, smoothness and stiffness. Hand feel is generally an estimated and subjective property of different fabrics, but in some studies, it can be measured statistically.

== Terms ==
Historically, the term "handle" was used in relation to wool, which was described as having good or poor handle depending on various characteristics, such as its softness, finesse, length, and elasticity.

== Industry ==
In the process of manufacturing textiles, fabrics are often treated in the objective of improving the hand feel of the final product. To achieve this, various finishes are used depending on the texture desired. For instance, stiffening textiles involves the use of thermoplastic resins and polymers, which are applied to prevent sagging and to ensure structural integrity of the cloth. Similar finishing techniques include parchmentising, which stiffens the treated cellulosic materials while imparting translucency, and draping, which focuses on how the clothing material produced folds and falls around the body. Fabric softeners are substances that aid in the softening, durability, and drape of fabrics. Softeners also help in providing body to the fabrics and facilitating other finishing processes, such as wrinkle resistance finish where fabrics become stiffened due to the finish. Silicone compounds, substituted ammonium compounds, fats, wax emulsions, and oils are the most commonly used softening agents.

== Factors ==
Hand feel may vary depending on fiber, various yarn parameters (such as hairiness, twist and yarn count), fabric weight (gsm), and fabric construction. Some undesired acid, alkaline, and temperature treatments can make certain fabrics harsher. The feel of some fabrics like silk (satin), fine muslins (mulmul), rayon (modal or lyocell), nylon, and microfiber are naturally soft.

The judgement of fabrics on the scale of soft to harsh is affected by the following parameters.

=== Fiber properties and yarn ===
The staple length and diameter of the constituting fibers affect the softness of the materials. More considerable fiber length needs less twisting, and loosely twisted yarns tend to have a softer hand feel. Such as how Egyptian, and pima cotton is softer than cotton with shorter fibers.

=== Texture ===
The factor of texture pertains to the characteristics of a fabric's surface and can be discerned through both visual and tactile perceptions. The texture of a fabric may be either smooth or rough. As natural fibers are characterized by inherent variations, they tend have greater texture compared to their synthetic or manufactured counterparts. The texture of a fabric is also greatly influenced by factors such as yarn type, finishing techniques, and fabric structure.

=== Surface contour ===
The surface contour of the fiber characterizes its outer surface along its shaft and may be rough, smooth, scaly, serrated, convoluted, or striated, all of which contribute to the friction, softness, and texture. The property is important for the texture and hand feel of the fabric that is made.

=== Fabric construction and thickness ===
The fabric construction and thickness of the cloth can present harsh or soft hand feel. Usually, the fine and lightweight structures with loose weave or knit constructions are more delicate until the twisted or textured yarns are not used. On the other hand, heavy, and thicker fabrics could be soft or harsh depending upon the after treatments and varied yarn forms.

=== Thermal effusivity ===
The thermal effusivity of a fabric plays an important role in how it feels. For example, cotton, linen, and rayon are good conductors of heat. Contact between such materials and the skin may reduce the temperature of the latter, creating an effect of coolness. On the other hand, wool and silk are poor thermal conductors and thus often feel warm to the touch.

== Testing ==
Different types of testing methods have been developed to assess hand feel using quantifiable properties. In the United States, the American Association of Textile Chemists and Colorists (AATCC) elaborated an assessment method (AATCC TM 202:2014) in the aim of determining a relative hand value using a comparison of the mechanical properties measured on a reference fabric and the material studied.

Similarly, the Kawabata evaluation system (KES) predicts human responses and understands the perception of softness. Additionally, it can be used to determine the transient heat transfer properties associated with the sensation of coolness generated when fabrics come into contact with the skin.

The hand feel of a specific clothing material can also be tested with an Interactive Touch-activated Display (also known as an "iTad") which is a touch screen device equipped with multitouch sensing that emulates tactile sensations.

== See also ==
- Aesthetics (textile)
- Clothing comfort
- Performance (textiles)
- Somatosensory system
- Sensory processing disorder
