= Organdy =

Sheer, plain-woven cotton fabric

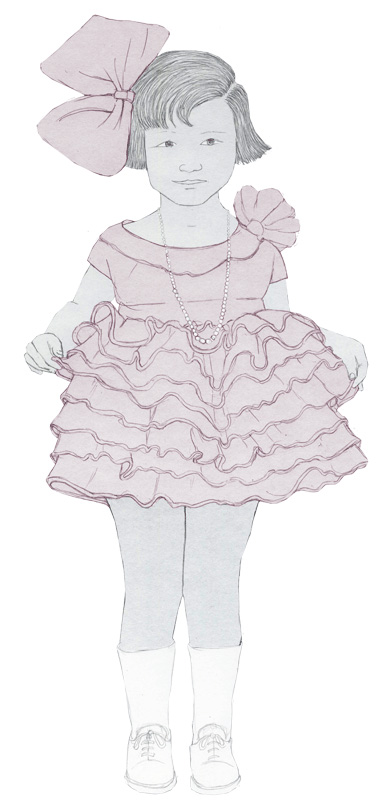
Little girl in an organdy dress. Circa 1900. Valencian Museum of Ethnology collection.

Organdy, also spelled Organdie, is a kind of fabric. It is a lightweight, balanced plain weave made of cotton with features of sheerness and crispness.

== Characteristics ==
Organdy is a stiffened material; sheerest among its peers, which include lawn cloth and Batiste. Often, these materials may come from the same grey goods, and are differentiated from each other in how they are finished. Organdy's sheerness and crispness are attributed to the acid finish (parchmentising) whereas the lawn cloth is finished with starch or resin, and Batiste is a softer fabric type. Finer yarns with higher twist counts are used in superior quality organdy.

== Process ==
Organdy is an acid stiffened cloth. Its sheerness and crispness is the result of an acid finish, where the fabric is treated with sulfuric acid solution for a short period and then neutralized to remove excessive acid in a process called "parchmentisation". Parchmentisation is a treatment of acid on cellulosic textiles in the pursuit of obtaining parchment characteristics. The finish offers a stiffened and translucent effect not dissimilar from silk organza. Figured Organdy is produced by applying an acid-resisting substance to a localised area; on the contrary, immersing it completely makes it stiffen all over. The objective of all-over parchmentizing is to create a transparent cloth.

== Use ==
Organdy was historically used for bridal dresses, ladies party dresses, and blouses. Organdy was a useful material as a Casement cloth, sheers, and lining etc. In the late 19th through mid 20th centuries, young girls wore dresses made of organdy. In the 21st century, this material has fallen out of favor in the childrenswear market because of its tendency to wrinkle, which can be attributed to its stiffness. Today, organdy is most often seen in high fashion collections by designers such as Marc Jacobs.

== See also ==
- Organza

== Sources ==
- Tortora, Phyllis (2006). Fairchild's Dictionary of Textiles 7th Edition. Fairchild. p. 396. ISBN 0-87005-707-3.
