= Product development (textiles) =

Developing and manufacturing new textile products that meet certain requirements

Product development in the context of textiles means developing and manufacturing new products that meet the requirements of serviceability as per user and target market while taking care of timelines, sell-ability, and profitability. It could be a new product altogether or an improvement or modification to an existing company's or a competitor's product. Product development involves many experts with specialist skills, from identifying product attributes to knowing how to make the product to fulfil consumer expectations.

== Serviceability and performance ==
The term "serviceability" refers to a textile product's ability to meet the needs of consumers. The emphasis is on knowing the target market and matching the needs of the target market to the product's serviceability. Aesthetics, durability, comfort and safety, appearance retention, care, environmental impact, and cost are the serviceability concepts employed in structuring the material.Likewise "performance" refers to the way a textile, textile component, or textile product responds to specific conditions or elements.

== Objectives ==
According to Michael Porter, the market is influenced by five driving forces:buyers (changing needs of the buyers), suppliers, new entrants, substitute products, and rivalry. The competitive intensity is determined by these five forces. Porter believes that a market can be transformed by the entry of new players or the introduction of substitute products. This emphasizes the critical nature of actual innovation in reclaiming a market leadership position.

=== Competence ===
Global competitiveness in the textile and garment industries has intensified in recent years, owing in part to changes in world trade policy. Textile manufacturing firms will need to be innovative while reducing cycle times and cutting costs in order to compete in the future of textiles and apparel. New product development methods help in improving the marketing of innovative items.

=== Innovation ===
Innovation is the systematic application of ideas that results in the introduction of new goods or services or the enhancement of existing ones.

==== Incremental and disruptive changes ====
Individual new fibers such as Spandex yarn may be considered incremental changes, but the advent of man-made fibers may be considered disruptive changes because they altered the perspective of customers who previously used natural fiber.

==== Technology ====
Textile production is a long chain that entails raw materials, fibers, and yarns, fabric manufacture, accessories, and conversion into various finished products, such as clothing. Textiles and fashion are intrinsically intertwined with their manufacture and application. Technically, fashion and textiles are inseparable words. The development of nylon in the 1940s resulted in the nylon stocking craze. Fabrics and trends clearly bear a lasting imprint, indicating when they were made and where they came from.

Technological advancements drive textile innovations.

== Process ==
=== Expectations and market ===
Product development begins with the identification of consumer expectations for the products and target markets.Throughout the textile industry, product development decisions are made to determine whether a market exists for them.

=== Research and development ===
Product development process involves many people with specialist skills, from identifying product attributes to knowing how to make the product to fulfil consumer expectations. The performance of prototypes (initial product samples) is examined in conjunction with user, wear, and product testing by R&D (research and development).

Product development includes basic research that leads to a new fiber, like lyocell, as well as applied research that helps to reduce hazards, such as the amount of waste that comes from dyeing and finishing clothes.

=== Related terms ===
==== Sample ====
A sample is a small portion of a particular lot that is taken out for testing and record-keeping purposes.

== See also ==
- Marketing
- Marketing mix
- Positioning (marketing)
- New product development
- Marketing strategies
- Diamond model
- Social Progress Index
- Strategic management
- Strategic planning
- Batch production
