= Clothing material =

Material used for clothing

Many clothing materials have been used to make garments throughout history. Grasses, furs, and much more complex and exotic materials have been used. Cultures near the Arctic Circle make their wardrobes out of processed furs and skins. Different cultures have added cloth to leather and skins as a way to replace real leather. A wide range of fibers, including natural, cellulose, and synthetic fibers, can be used to weave or knit cloth. From natural fibers like cotton and silk to synthetic ones like polyester and nylon, it most certainly reflects culture.

Humans have shown extreme inventiveness in devising clothing solutions to environmental hazards and the distinction between clothing and other protective equipment is not always clear-cut; examples include space suit, air conditioned clothing, armor, diving suit, swimsuit, bee-keeper's protective clothing, motorcycle leathers, high-visibility clothing, and protective clothing in general.

== History of clothing materials ==
It can be assumed that the animal skins were used for clothing throughout the human history, although in the ways that are primitive when compared to the modern processing, the earliest known samples come from Ötzi the Iceman (late 4th millennium BC) with his goatskin clothes made from leather strips put together using sinews, bearskin hat, and shoes using the deerskin for the uppers and goatskin for the soles. Grass was used for the woven cloak and socks-like stuffing inside the shoes.

The weaving is also very old: an impression in hardened clay found in the Czech Republic suggests availability of woven material in Paleolithic 25,000 years before present. It is generally believed that woven wool production began in the 11th millennium BC; it certainly had been used in the clothing of ancient Persians, Greeks, and Romans. The other natural fibers used for the yarn were flax (linen), silk, and cotton. Earliest indications of linen use come from Ancient Egypt, and silk production originated in China (according to a legend, 5000 years ago). Deuteronomy contains a prohibition on mixing wool and linen in clothing material. The earliest known use of cotton fabrics (late 4th millennium BC) is found in India; it spread to Rome by 350 BC.

== Insulation ==
The insulation qualities of clothing materials are determined by the amount of "dead air" they can hold. The air is held in the voids inside the material itself as well as in the gaps between the clothing layers. Of the natural clothing materials, fur and leather provide the best insulation. Wool, with its lanolin oil, is not very absorbent and keeps its insulation properties well when wet, unlike cotton.

== Examples of clothing materials ==
=== Natural materials ===
Common natural clothing materials include:

- Linen
- Cashmere wool
- Cotton
- Cellulosic fibres/viscose
- Wool
- Hemp
- Ramie
- Silk
- Leather
- Down for down-filled parkas
- Fur

=== Synthetic materials ===
Other materials are made from synthetic fibers, primarily from petrochemicals, which are not generally biodegradable. Common synthetic materials include:

- Nylon
- Polyesters
- Spandex (elastane)

=== Less common materials ===
Some less common clothing materials are:

- Acetate
- Cupro
- Flannel
- Lyocell
- PVC-Polyvinyl chloride
- Rayon
- Recycled PET
- Recycled paper
- Tyvek
- Vinylon
- Bamboo
- Jute

== Sources ==
- Woolfson, Michael M. (2010). "Clothing Materials". Materials, matter & particles: a brief history. London : Singapore; Hackensack, NJ: Imperial College Press; Distributed by World Scientific Pub. pp. 230–235. ISBN 978-1-84816-460-4. OCLC 377754710.
- United States Air Force (2008). "Clothing Materials". U.S. Air Force Survival Handbook. Air Force regulation. Skyhorse. p. 143. ISBN 978-1-60239-245-8.
