= Deweighting =

Textile technique of weight reduction

Deweighting, deweighing or weight reduction, is a chemical treatment that peels the surface of polyester fibers and makes them softer and finer. It also reduces the fiber weight and hence weakens the strength. Additionally, the treatment enhances the absorbency of the treated substrates. Deweighting is an alkaline hydrolysis treatment that affects the surface fibers of the polyester and reduces the decitex or denier of fibers, weight loss of between 10% and 30% is possible during the treatment. Polyester and cotton blends can be treated with an alkali process to make them look and feel like silk.

== Process of deweighting ==
When Sodium hydroxide (5~10 grams per litre) is applied to polyester in hot conditions, the chemical reaction peels off the surface of the polyester fibers and changes the surface of the finished product, making it softer and finer in texture. During treatment, it is necessary to consider the loss of strength and the degree of softness. Treatment may be carried out by the exhaust method in a dyeing vessel such as an overflow, HT, or winch dyeing machine. The addition of a cationic accelerator and the use of a HT (high temperature) vessel can accelerate the alkalization process. Finally, an anionic surfactant is applied to prevent further deweighting and to aid in the dispersion of the peeled fibers.

=== Alkali deweighing of polyester ===
Alkali deweighing treatment of polyester fiber is a complicated process that includes treatment with caustic at a hot temperature. The hydraulic action peels the surface, resulting in a weakening of the fiber and an increase in its softness and fineness. Hence, care should be taken while treating. The deweighting rate of the fabric can be changed by manipulating the temperature and time.

Alkali deweighting of polyester fiber with imidazole ionic liquid is helpful in accelerating the deweighing action. The processing with imidazole ionic liquid can improve alkali deweighting efficiency and increase alkali agent usage rate while using less alkali agent.

=== One-bath alkali deweighting and dyeing process ===
Deweighting and simultaneously dyeing with disperse dye is also possible, which avoids the two-step process of deweighting and then dyeing in another bath.

=== Bicomponent ===
Alkali deweighting of bicomponent containing polytrimethylene terephthalate/polyamide 6 separates the PTT and nylon components of the yarns, resulting in superfine filaments with a change in fiber diameter and shape.
