= Maurice Sonnenberg =

American businessman

Maurice Sonnenberg has served as an outside advisor to five Presidential Administrations in the areas of international trade, finance, international relations, intelligence, and foreign election monitoring.

== Biography ==
=== Education ===
Sonnenberg is a graduate of the Georgetown University School of Foreign Service (B.S.), Georgetown Law Center, and New York University International Law (M.S.). He served in the D.C. Air National Guard from 1959 to 1962 and the U.S. Air Force Reserve.

=== Politics ===
Sonnenberg began his career, while at Georgetown University, as an aide to Senator William Proxmire of Wisconsin, who later headed the Senate Banking Committee, having previously worked for the Lyndon B. Johnson-Hubert Humphrey Presidential campaign as director of special projects. From 1983 to 1993 he was Chairman of the Democratic House & Senate Council. Among his Senate co-chairs at the time were Sen. George Mitchel, Sen. Joseph Biden, Sen. Bob Graham, Sen. John Kerry, and Sen. John D. Rockefeller IV. Among the House co-chairs were current Majority Leader Steny H. Hoyer and former Congressman Robert G. Torricelli.

=== Intelligence and Foreign Policy ===
In 1994 and 1995, he served as a member of the Moynihan Commission on Government Secrecy, and in 1996 as the Senior Advisor to the U.S. Commission on the Roles and Capabilities of the U.S. Intelligence Community. [Aspin–Brown Commission] He was a member of the President's Foreign Intelligence Advisory Board under President Bill Clinton for 8 years.

In 2000, he served as vice-chairman of the National Commission on Terrorism. According to Sonnenberg, 28 of the 33 recommendations from the report made it to the USA Patriot Act. He has claimed the September 11 attacks could have been prevented if all the recommendations had been implemented.

In 2002, he was a member of the Task Force Report No. 40 of the Council on Foreign Relations called Terrorist Financing. In 2012–14, he served as co-chairman of the National Commission for the Review of the Research and Development Programs for the Intelligence Community. He has also served as an Official U.S. Observer at elections in Latin America. This includes multiple elections in El Salvador, Guatemala, Nicaragua, and Mexico. He was appointed by the Congress and Administration for these tasks. He serves on the Board of Advisors of the Chertoff Group, headed by Michael Chertoff.(Former Secretary of Homeland Security)

Sonnenberg has served as a foreign policy adviser to various presidential administrations, including:

- 2021: Commission on Geopolitical Impacts of New Technology & Data - Atlantic Council
- 2019: Trans National Threats Project - CSIS
- 2012-2014: Co-chairman, National Commission for the Review of the Research and Development Programs of the U.S. Intelligence Community
- 2012: Official Observer, Mexican Federal Election Commission
- 2011: Southwest Border Task Force, Department of Homeland Security
- 2008-2015: Secretary of the Navy Panel Advisory Board
- 2007-2010: Department of Homeland Security Advisory Council
- 2006: Official Observer Team, Mexican Federal Election Commission
- 2004-2007: White House Advisor, Central American Free Trade Agreement and Colombian Free Trade Agreement
- 2003-2004: Co-chair, National Commission for the Review of Research and Development Programs of the U. S. Intelligence Community
- 2002: Counter Terrorism Advisory Board, New York City Police Department
- 2001-2002: Terrorism Task Force, Council on Foreign Relations
- 2001-2002: Roundtable on Terrorism, Council on Foreign Relations
- 2000: U.S. Presidential Delegation to Inauguration of President Vicente Fox of Mexico
- 1999-2000: U.S. National Commission on Terrorism, Vice-chairman
- 1998: U.S. Presidential Delegation to Inauguration of President Miguel Rodriguez of Costa Rica
- 1995-1997: Commissioner, U.S. Commission on Protecting and Reducing Government Secrecy
- 1995-1996: Senior Advisor, U.S. Commission on the Roles and Capabilities of the U.S. Intelligence Community
- 1994: U.S. Presidential Delegation to the Inauguration of President Ernesto Zedillo of Mexico
- 1994: U.S. Observer Team, Mexican elections, NDI/IRI/Carter Center
- 1994: Official U.S. Observer Team, El Salvador elections
- 1993-2001: President's Foreign Intelligence Advisory Board
- 1991-1992: White House Advisor, Enterprise of the Americas Initiative ("Brady Bill")
- 1990: Election Observer, Nicaragua, Council of Freely Elected Heads of State
- 1989: Official U.S. Observer Team, El Salvador
- 1984-1985: Official U.S. Observer Team, El Salvador and Guatemala
- 1979-1981: Member, President's Export Council
- 1979-1980: Member, The Task Force on International Trade of the White House Conference of Small Business
- 1967: Special U.S. Representative, Economic Commission for Europe
- 1965-1967: Industrial/Economic Advisor, U.S. Commission on the Status of Puerto Rico

Clearance: Three Top Secret SCI (currently expired)

=== Finance and Law ===
Sonnenberg has worked at the investment banking firms Bear Stearns, J.P. Morgan, and Donaldson Lufkin and Jenrette, and at the law firms Hunton & Williams, Manatt, Phelps & Phillips and with Guggenheim Securities as Senior International Advisor. He was a senior advisor at Advanced Metallurgical Group, N.V.

=== Awards and Affiliations ===
- Encyclopædia Britannica (NY) - Board of Directors
- Council on Foreign Relations (NY) - Member
- Atlantic Council (Washington DC)- Geo-Tech Commission - Member
- Center for Strategic & International Studies (Washington DC)- The Trans National Threat Project - Member
- Llewellyn Family Foundation - (NY) Co-founder, Board of Directors
- Carnegie Council on Ethics and International Affairs (NY)- Former Member
- Business Executives for National Security (Washington DC)- Former Member
- Foreign Policy Association (NY) - Former Board of Governors and Vice Chairman, Board of Directors (1985–2000)
- Americas Society (NY)- Member
- Council of the Americas (NY)- Member
- Mexican Cultural Institute (NY) - Former Board of Advisors
- Gazette International Networking Institute (St. Louis) - Board of Directors, emeritus
- Post Polio Health International Board of Honor - (St. Louis) - Board Member
- Harlem Educational Activities Fund (NY) - Founder 1990, Board of Directors, emeritus
- Institute of east–west dynamics (NY) - Former Board of Directors (1989–1993)
- US- Mexico Society (Washington DC) - Former Board of Directors, Secretary-Treasurer (1991–1994)
- Humanitarian Foundation for Nicaragua (NY) - Former Board of Directors (1990–1994)
- Georgetown University (Washington DC) - Board of Regents (1982–1991, three terms)
- Pro Democracy for Central America, PRODEMCA - Member (1984–1989)
- Screen Actors Guild - Member

Sonnenberg was awarded Order of the Mexican Eagle (Orden Mexicana del Aguila Azteca) in 2000 by President Ernesto Zedillo. The award was presented by the Administration of President Fox.

In addition, Maurice Sonnenberg has appeared on television and published articles on intelligence, political, foreign affairs, trade issues, and American history. He has been a public speaker in the U.S. and abroad on economics, intelligence & counter-terrorism, political and foreign relations. He has also testified before Congress on some of these subjects.
