= Silk surfacing =

Surface finishing of cotton to obtain an appearance similar to silk

Silk surfacing was a surface finishing of cotton to obtain an appearance similar to silk.

== Process ==
In contrast to other imitative finishes such as mercerizing, In Silk surfacing, real silk was used in this treatment. Cotton was treated with acid and then silk waste (mixed) solution cotton to provide a lustrous appearance.

=== Treatment ===
The steps are as follows:

1. Soaking of cotton yarns in Tannic acid or other metallic acid.
2. Soaking in a solution of pure silk (of dissolved Silk waste/remnants in some acid.)
3. Dry
4. Passing through rollers.

The cotton is encased with silk. Although the finish was less durable, was adapted for selected products only that were less likely to wash.

== See also ==
- Finishing (textiles)
- Plasma treatment (textiles)
