= Kawabata evaluation system =

System to measure mechanical properties of fabrics

The Kawabata evaluation system (KES) is used to measure the mechanical properties of fabrics. The system was developed by a team led by Professor Kawabata in the department of polymer chemistry, Kyoto University Japan.

KES is composed of four different machines on which a total of six tests can be performed:

- Tensile & shear tester – tensile, shear
- Pure bending tester – pure bending
- Compression tester – compression
- Surface tester – surface friction and roughness
