= Mercerisation =

Chemical treatment for cellulosic yarns

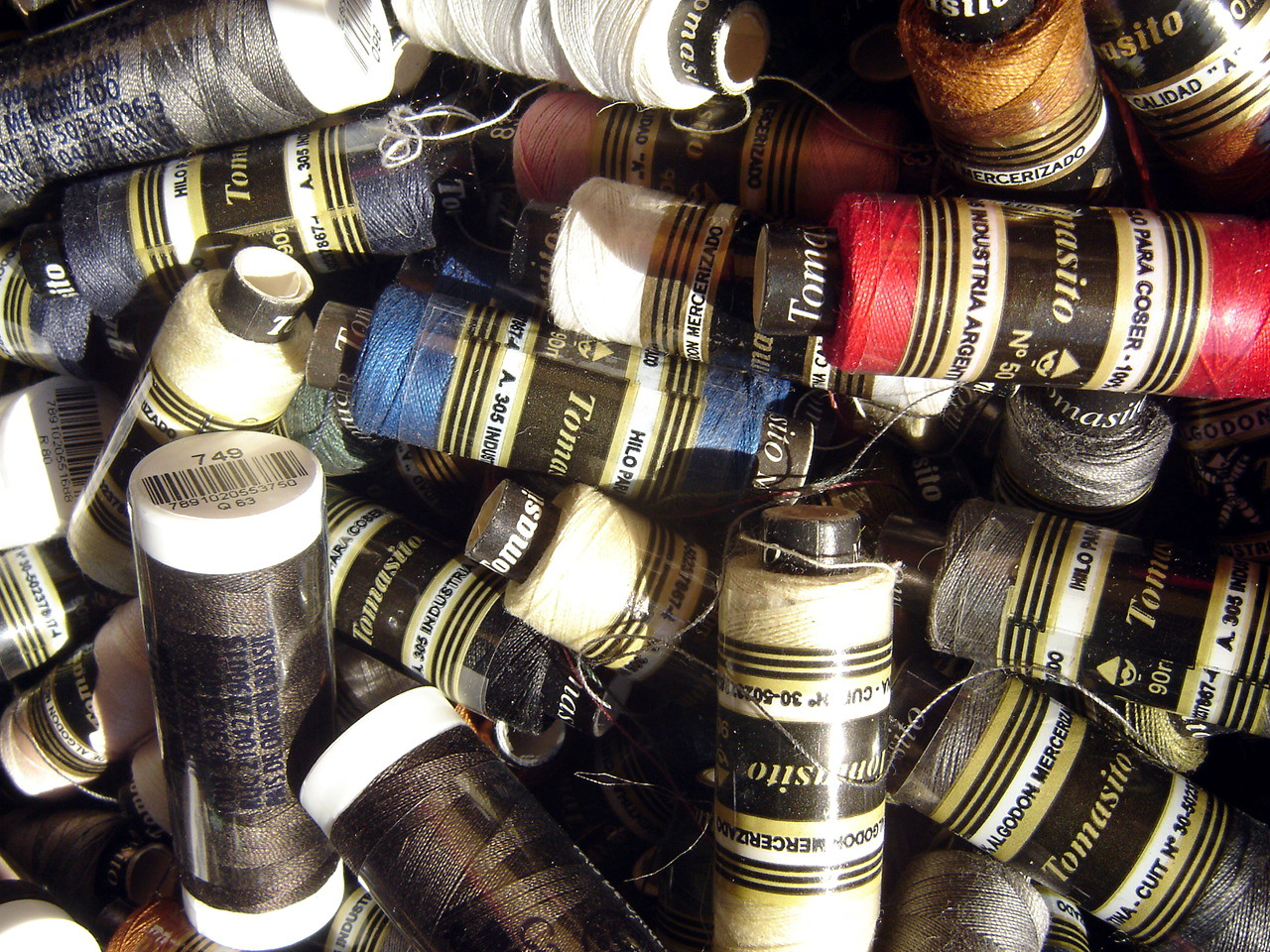
Mercerized cotton yarn reels

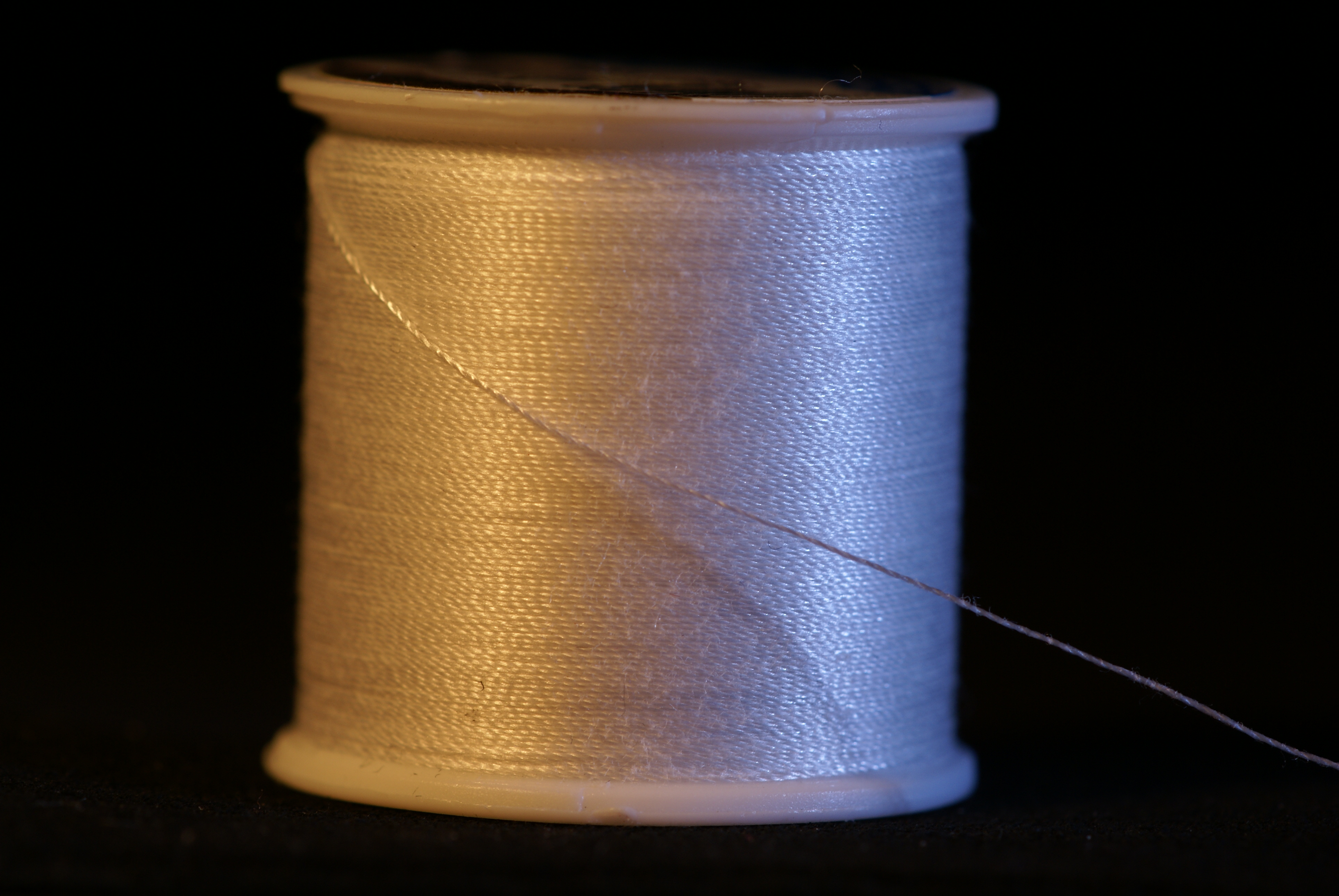
Spool of a two-ply mercerized cotton thread with a polyester core.

Mercerisation is a textile finishing treatment for cellulose fabric and yarn, mainly cotton and flax, which improves dye uptake and tear strength, reduces fabric shrinkage, and imparts a silk-like luster.

== Development ==
The process was devised in 1844 by John Mercer, who treated cotton with solutions of 20–30% sodium hydroxide followed by washing. Mercer observed that the treatment shrank the fabric and increased its tensile strength and affinity for dyes. In the original process of Mercer, no tension was applied. The product was termed fulled cotton, a nod to the process of fulling in woven wool fabric. Mercer regarded the increased affinity for dyes as the most important technical aspect. Mercer also experimented with sulfuric acid and zinc chloride solutions and discovered the parchmentising effect of sulfuric acid.

The silk-like lustre now commonly associated with mercerising is produced by tension and was discovered by Horace Lowe in 1889.

== Process ==
Treatment with sodium hydroxide destroys the spiral form of the cellulose with formation of alkali cellulose, which is changed to cellulose hydrate on washing out the alkali. Caustic soda concentrations of 20–26% are used. Effective mercerization requires the use of wetting agents.

The improved lustre of mercerised cotton is due to the production of nearly circular cotton fibres under tension. Another characteristic feature is the untwisting (deconvolution) of the cotton hair.

In dry mercerization, the process is carried out while drying the fabric on a stenter.
