= Textile Research Journal =

- Discipline: Textile manufacturing
- Language: English
- Edited by: Prof. Roshan Paul

Publication details
- Former names: T.R.I. Bulletin, Textile Research
- History: 1931-present
- Publisher: Sage Publications Ltd.
- Frequency: 24 issues per year
- Impact factor: 2.2 (2025)

Standard abbreviations
- ISO 4: Text. Res. J.

Indexing
- CODEN: TRJOA9
- ISSN: 0040-5175 (print); 1746-7748 (web)
- LCCN: 34029794
- OCLC no.: 300298171

Links
- Journal homepage; Online access; All issues

The Textile Research Journal (TRJ) is a peer reviewed scientific journal published by Sage Publications Ltd., UK. The journal's Editor-in-Chief is Prof. Roshan Paul from University of Beira Interior, Portugal. Dr. Dong Zhang from Textile Research Associates, USA was the immediate past Editor-in-Chief, and is continuing as the Emeritus Editor.

== Historical Aspects ==
In April 1930, the Textile Research Council, USA along with the Research Conference Committee of the American Association of Textile Chemists and Colorists (AATCC), held a conference to decide upon the importance of establishing a national research institute to advance scientific research within the US textile industry. This joint initiative lead to the founding of the United States Institute for Textile Research, Inc. (later known as Textile Research Institute and TRI Princeton) in Princeton, with an aim to foster scientific research in fibers, textile manufacturing and finishing. In order to raise funding to meet the expenses of the institute, several contributing members were added, in addition to the original members. Pacific Mills was elected as the first life member of the institute, and the founding institutions, AATCC and the Textile Research Council also joined, allowing several of their members to join the institute.

Since its inception, the institute was working in close collaboration with Princeton University, and it established the Textile Research Journal as T.R.I. Bulletin, an official publication of United States Institute for Textile Research, Inc., in February 1931. The first bulletins were designed to keep the members informed of the activities and accomplishments of the institute. Subsequently, its scope was expanded to include research abstracts and bibliography. From November 1932 onwards, it was renamed as Textile Research and published as a scientific journal.

Sometime in 1944, the Board of Directors of the institute proposed a new format for the journal making it a technical and scientific publication devoted to the interests of textile research community and industry. It was also decided to make the journal available to both members and non-members by subscription, and in February 1945, the name was further changed to Textile Research Journal, for enabling easy reference and citation.

Over the years, TRI Princeton gradually moved away from the textile field, and in the 1980’s started focusing on hair fibers. Further, it expanded its portfolio to cosmetic science, including hair care and skin care, although they still do some research and testing works on textiles. Sage Publications Ltd., the current publisher took over the journal from TRI Princeton in 2005. For several years, the journal was publishing 12 issues per year, in 2009 it got expanded to 18 issues, and subsequently in 2010 to 20 issues. From 2018 onwards, there are two issues every month (24 issues per year).

== Editors ==
In February 1945, it was during the editorship of Julian S. Jacobs the name of the journal was changed from Textile Research to Textile Research Journal. He thus became the first editor of the Textile Research Journal. In May 1959, Richard K. Toner became the editor and he steered the journal till 1974. Then onwards, Ludwig Rebenfeld, who was the director and president of TRI, took over the editorship and continued until May 2004.

Soon after, Yashavanth K. Kamath, the research director of TRI became the editor, and it was during his time that Sage Publications Ltd. took over the journal. He was thus the first editor under Sage and continued until 2007. From March 2007 until December 2025, Dong Zhang was the editor-in-chief, and he was supported by an editorial board, composed of textile scientists and technologists from all over the world. From January 2026 onwards, Roshan Paul has been the editor-in-chief.

== Current Journal ==
The Textile Research Journal covers the field of materials science, with a focus on fibers and textiles, and it introduces novel concepts, innovative technologies, and industrially relevant advances in fibers, textile materials, chemistry and processes. It accepts manuscripts from all over the world, and its current expanded scope covers the complete textile value chain and related areas. So, the research works currently published in the journal include: natural, synthetic and bio-based polymeric materials; spinning, knitting and weaving; engineered textile fabrics, nonwovens and composites; textile machinery, production processes and manufacture; chemical and surface modifications of fibers and textile substrates; dyes and pigments, textile pretreatments, dyeing, printing, functional finishing, coating, textile care, detergents; testing and certification of textile products, etc.

On the technical textiles side, the journal publishes articles on all the topics, including their applications in personal protective equipment, personal care products, sportswear, medical textiles, filtration, geotextiles, agrotextiles, construction, transportation, aviation and space, as well as in smart, intelligent and shape memory applications. It also covers various aspects of sustainable innovations, such as: alternative raw materials, regenerative manufacturing, sustainable fashion, eco-friendly processes, waste reduction, textile circularity, recycling and effluent treatments. Other areas include nanotechnology and biotechnology applications, plasma treatment, clothing physiology, management of product design, eco-designs, statistical analysis, economics, supply chain management, logistics, and digitalisation and application of robotics and Artificial Intelligence (AI) in textile manufacturing.

The journal is a member of the Committee on Publication Ethics (COPE), and follows a two way anonymous peer review process based on their guidelines. Acknowledging the contributions of the reviewers, it offers them a limited period free access to some of the Sage journals and also a discount on some of the Sage books ordered online. Moreover, it collaborates with Web of Science Reviewer Recognition Service to provide the reviewers the recognition of their contributions.

== Highly Cited Papers ==
Some of the highly cited papers published in the journal include:

- Segal L, Creely JJ, Martin AE, Conrad CM. An Empirical Method for Estimating the Degree of Crystallinity of Native Cellulose Using the X-Ray Diffractometer. Textile Research Journal. 1959; 29 (10):786-794. doi:10.1177/004051755902901003 (cited more than 9750 times).
- Yuan Gao, Cranston R. Recent Advances in Antimicrobial Treatments of Textiles. Textile Research Journal. 2008; 78 (1):60-72. doi:10.1177/0040517507082332 (cited more than 1400 times).
- Simoncic B, Tomsic B. Structures of Novel Antimicrobial Agents for Textiles - A Review. Textile Research Journal. 2010; 80 (16):1721-1737. doi:10.1177/0040517510363193 (cited more than 770 times).
- Ilyas R, Sapuan S, Atikah M, et al. Effect of hydrolysis time on the morphological, physical, chemical, and thermal behavior of sugar palm nanocrystalline cellulose (Arenga pinnata (Wurmb.) Merr). Textile Research Journal. 2020; 91 (1-2):152-167. doi:10.1177/0040517520932393 (cited more than 250 times).
- Paul R, Bautista L, De la Varga M, et al. Nano-cotton Fabrics with High Ultraviolet Protection. Textile Research Journal. 2009; 80(5):454-462. doi:10.1177/0040517509342316 (cited more than 150 times).

== Abstracting and Indexing ==
The journal is abstracted and indexed in Scopus and Clarivate Science Citation Index Expanded (SCIE). Before 2007, the impact factor of the journal was around 0.3, in 2008 it increased to more than 1.0, and in 2019 it was above 2.0. Its 2025 impact factor is 2.2 and the 5-year impact factor is 2.3, ranking it 13th out of 31 journals in the category "Materials Science, Textiles".

It is also abstracted and indexed in AATA Online: Abstracts of International Conservation Literature, Applied Mechanics Reviews, Applied Science & Technology Index, Biological Abstracts Family of Products, Chemical Abstracts Service (CAS), Clarivate Analytics: Biological Abstracts, Clarivate Social Sciences Citation Index (SSCI), Current Contents/Engineering, Computing & Technology, Polymer Library/Rapra Abstracts, etc.
