= Textile performance =

Fitness for purpose of textiles

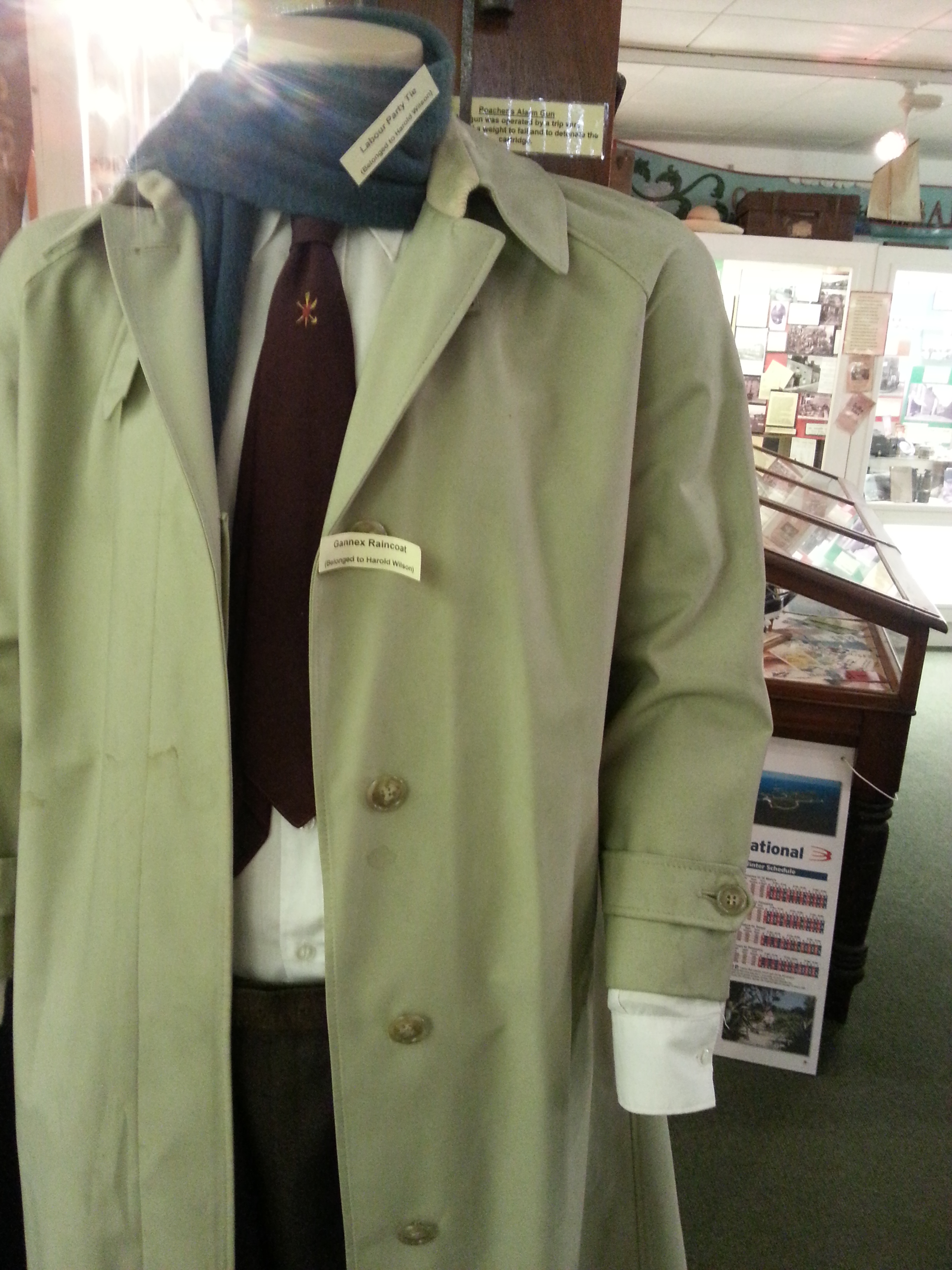
A Gannex raincoat with water-resistant properties

Textile performance, also known as fitness for purpose, is a textile's capacity to withstand various conditions, environments, and hazards, qualifying it for particular uses. The performance of textile products influences their appearance, comfort, durability, and protection. The different textile applications (automotive, clothing, sleepwear, workwear, sportswear, upholstery, and PPE) require a different set of performance parameters. As a result, the specifications determine the level of performance of a textile product. Textile testing certifies the product's conformity to buying specification. It also describes product manufactured for non-aesthetic purposes, where fitness for purpose is the primary criterion. Engineering of high-performance fabrics presents a unique set of challenges.

The fitness for purpose of textile products is an important consideration for both producers and buyers. Producers, distributors and retailers favor the expectations of the target market, and fashion their wares accordingly.

== Serviceability in textiles ==
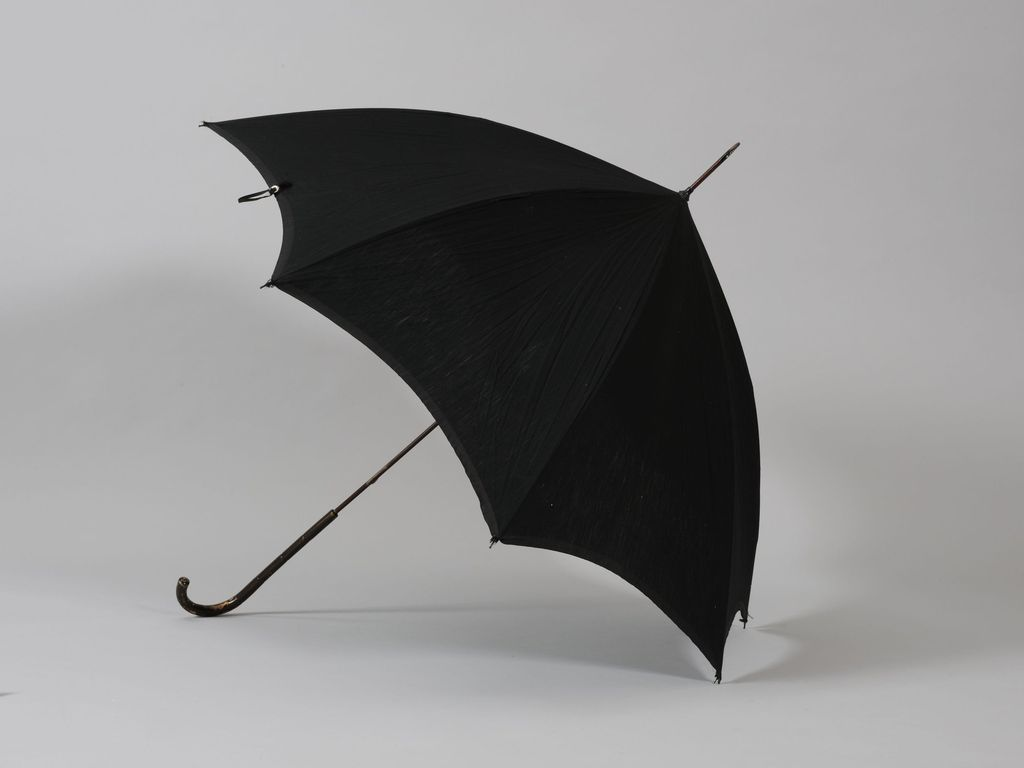
A modern umbrella fabric has specific requirements for colour fastness to light, water and wet rubbing, and permeability.

Serviceability in textiles or Performance is the ability of textile materials to withstand various conditions, environments, and hazards. The term "serviceability" refers to a textile product's ability to meet the needs of consumers. The emphasis is on knowing the target market and matching the needs of the target market to the product's serviceability.

=== Concepts of serviceability in textiles ===
Aesthetics, durability, comfort and safety, appearance retention, care, environmental impact, and cost are the serviceability concepts employed in structuring the material.

==== Aesthetics ====
Aesthetics imply the appearance and attraction of textile products; it includes the color, pattern and texture of the material.

==== Durability ====
Durability in textiles refers to the product's capacity to endure use; the amount of time the product is regarded adequate for the intended application.

==== Comfort ====
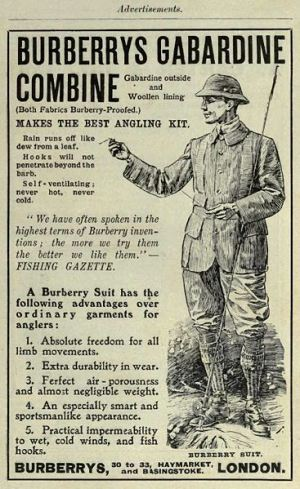
Burberry advertisement for waterproof gabardine suit, 1908

The performance of textiles extends to functionality through comfort and protection. The term "comfort" (or "being comfortable") refers to a state of physical or psychological well-being—our perceptions, physiological, social, and psychological requirements are all part of it. After food, It is the clothing that satisfies these comfort needs. Clothing provides comfort on a number of levels, including aesthetic, tactile, thermal, moisture, and pressure.

- Aesthetic comfort: Aesthetic comfort is associated with visual perception that is influenced by color, fabric construction, finish, style, garment fit, and fashion compatibility. Comfort on an aesthetic level is necessary for psychological and social well-being.
- Thermoregulation in humans and thermophysiological comfort: Thermophysiological comfort is the capacity of the clothing material that makes the balance of moisture and heat between the body and the environment. It is a property of textile materials that creates ease by maintaining moisture and thermal levels in a human's resting and active states. The selection of textile material significantly affects the comfort of the wearer. Different textile fibers have unique properties, that make them suitable for use in various environments. Natural fibers are breathable and absorb moisture. The major determinants that influence thermophysiological comfort are permeable construction, heat, and moisture transfer rate.
  - Thermal comfort: One primary criterion for our physiological needs is thermal comfort. The heat dissipation effectiveness of clothing gives the wearer a neither very hot nor very cold feel. The optimum temperature for thermal comfort of the skin surface is between 28 and 30 °C (82 and 86 °F), i.e., a neutral temperature. Thermophysiology reacts whenever the temperature falls below or exceeds the neutral point on either side; it is discomforting below 28 and above 30 degrees. Clothing maintains a thermal balance; it keeps the skin dry and cool. It helps to keep the body from overheating while avoiding heat from the environment.
  - Moisture comfort: Moisture comfort is the prevention of a damp sensation. According to Hollies' research, it feels uncomfortable when more than "50% to 65% of the body is wet."
- Tactile comfort: Tactile comfort is a resistance to the discomfort related to the friction created by clothing against the body. It is related to the smoothness, roughness, softness, and stiffness of the fabric used in clothing. The degree of tactile discomfort may vary between individuals. It is possible due to various factors, including allergies, tickling, prickling, skin abrasion, coolness, and the fabric's weight, structure, and thickness. There are specific surface finishes (mechanical and chemical) that can enhance tactile comfort. Fleece sweatshirts and velvet clothing, for example. Soft, clingy, stiff, heavy, light, hard, sticky, scratchy, prickly are all terms used to describe tactile sensations.
- Pressure comfort: The comfort of the human body's pressure receptors' (present in the skin) sensory response towards clothing. Fabrics with Lycra feels more comfortable because of this response and superior pressure comfort. The sensation response is influenced by the material's structure: snugging, looseness, heavy, light, soft, or stiff structuring.

==== Protection ====
The transformative power of clothes, the impact of changes in colors and style. A video on social expression through dress.

Protection in textiles refers to a large application area where the performance (of functionality) is more central than aesthetic values.

- UV protection performance in textiles, There are tests to quantify the protection values from harmful ultraviolet rays.
- Flame retardant textiles
- Water repellant performance of textiles
- Waterproofness
- Cold and wind protection textiles
- Bacteria and virus protection in textiles. Antiviral textiles are a further exploitation of using antimicrobial surfaces that are applicable to both natural and synthetic textiles. Exhibiting antiviral properties, these surfaces may inactivate the lipid-coated viruses. There are particular test methods for assessing the performance of antiviral textiles.
- Bulletproof vest

==== Appearance retention ====
The ability of a textile product to retain its appearance after being used, washed, and ironed is referred to as appearance retention.

==== Care ====
The treatment necessary to maintain the appearance of textile products is referred to as care. Textile products need to be cleaned and ironed to keep their look. This includes things like how to wash them and how to dry them. Care labelling for textile products takes into account the performance of each component as well as the manufacturing methods.

==== Cost ====
It is influenced by a variety of elements. The cost of a textile product includes the raw material, manufacturing, and maintenance costs.

==== Environmental impact ====
Every textile product has an impact on the environment. The extent to which textiles harm the environment during manufacturing, care, and disposal is a concept of textile serviceability. The substances which add performance to textiles have a severe impact on the environment and on human health. The halogenated flame retardants, PFC treated stain repellant, and triclosan or triclocarban or silver-containing antimicrobial fabrics certainly have a lot to do with the effluent and environment.

Name of the substance	Advantage in textile products	Associated health risks and environmental impacts	References
Perfluorooctanoic acid ( PFOA), Polytetrafluoroethylene (Teflon)	Hydrophobic effect	Endocrine disruptor	
Fluorocarbon (PFC)	Hydrophobic effect	May cause respiratory illness	
Bromine	Brominated flame retardant	Persistent, bioaccumulative and toxic substances may cause Neurobehavioral disorders and Endocrine disruption	
Silver Or Silver nanoparticle	Antimicrobial resistance	Environmental impact of silver nanoparticles and toxic effects on human health	

Fundamentally, each fiber and fabric has distinct properties, and they are chosen based on their suitability for fitness for purpose. Users have five basic criteria for performance, including appearance, comfort, durability, maintenance, and cost. These performance expectations are not the same as those of specialist textiles. Due to the often highly technical and legal requirements of these products, these textiles are typically tested in order to ensure they meet stringent performance requirements. A few examples of different areas are:

- Sportswear must have these characteristics: strength, moisture management, stretch, and thermal comfort.
- Military textiles demand protection from hostile weather. A bulletproof vest necessitates low impact. Camouflage may be needed.
- Firefighting clothing must be flame resistant, thermally resistant, and lightweight. Water resistance and visibility are requirements for bunker gear. Turnout gear for firefighters is not a "one size fits all" proposition. It depends on the individual role and duties assigned. (Note: E.g., bomb suit, emergency medical, fall protection, HazMat, industrial flash fire, PASS, proximity firefighting, which requires a fire proximity suit, SCBA, fire station/work uniforms, structural firefighting, thermal imaging cameras, urban search and rescue or wildland firefighting.)
- Occupational hazards demand a specific degree of protection.
- Medical textiles need clothing with barriers and antimicrobial surfaces, such as cleanroom suits and hazmat suits.
- Wearable electronics in E-textiles require flexibility as well as washability. (See Wearable technology and Hexoskin.)
- Body armor (protective clothing designed to absorb or deflect physical attacks) demands specific performance standards.
- Wetsuits are made with neoprene and butyl rubber. The foamed neoprene of the suit thermally insulates the wearer.
- Automotive textiles have specific performance requirements in various sections of the car. The different types of fibers used for separate areas of the car's interior are shown below:

Car section or part	Fabric consumption in square meters	Material	Properties of fibers	Performance expectations from the material used
Airbags	3.5	Nylon coated with silicone or neoprene from inside	Strong, elastic, tough and stable in terms of shrinkage	Capability of holding air when inflated and should be strong enough to withstand the impact without rupturing
Upholstery	10.0	Nylon and polyester	Abrasion resistance	Strong abrasion resistance to withstand the friction of sliding objects and passengers. To retain the shape and smoothness of the seats. Colors should be fast to sunlight and rubbing to sustain the exposure.
Carpet	4.0	Nylon	Strong, tough and abrasion resistant	Strong enough to stand friction, the material must be tough and resilient
Trunk	4.0–5.0	Nylon	Strong, tough and abrasion resistant	Strong enough to stand friction, antimicrobial
Seat belts	0.5	Polyester		
Headliner	4.0–6.0	Composite/blended/laminated fabric adheres to melted polyurethane foam	Strong, insulating	Aesthetics, feel, stiffness, and sound reduction

Tensile strength, bursting, sensorial comfort, thermal comfort, heat transfer, water repellency MVTR, air permeability, pilling, shrinkage, fading, lightfastness, drape and hand feel are a few performance parameters.

== Properties ==
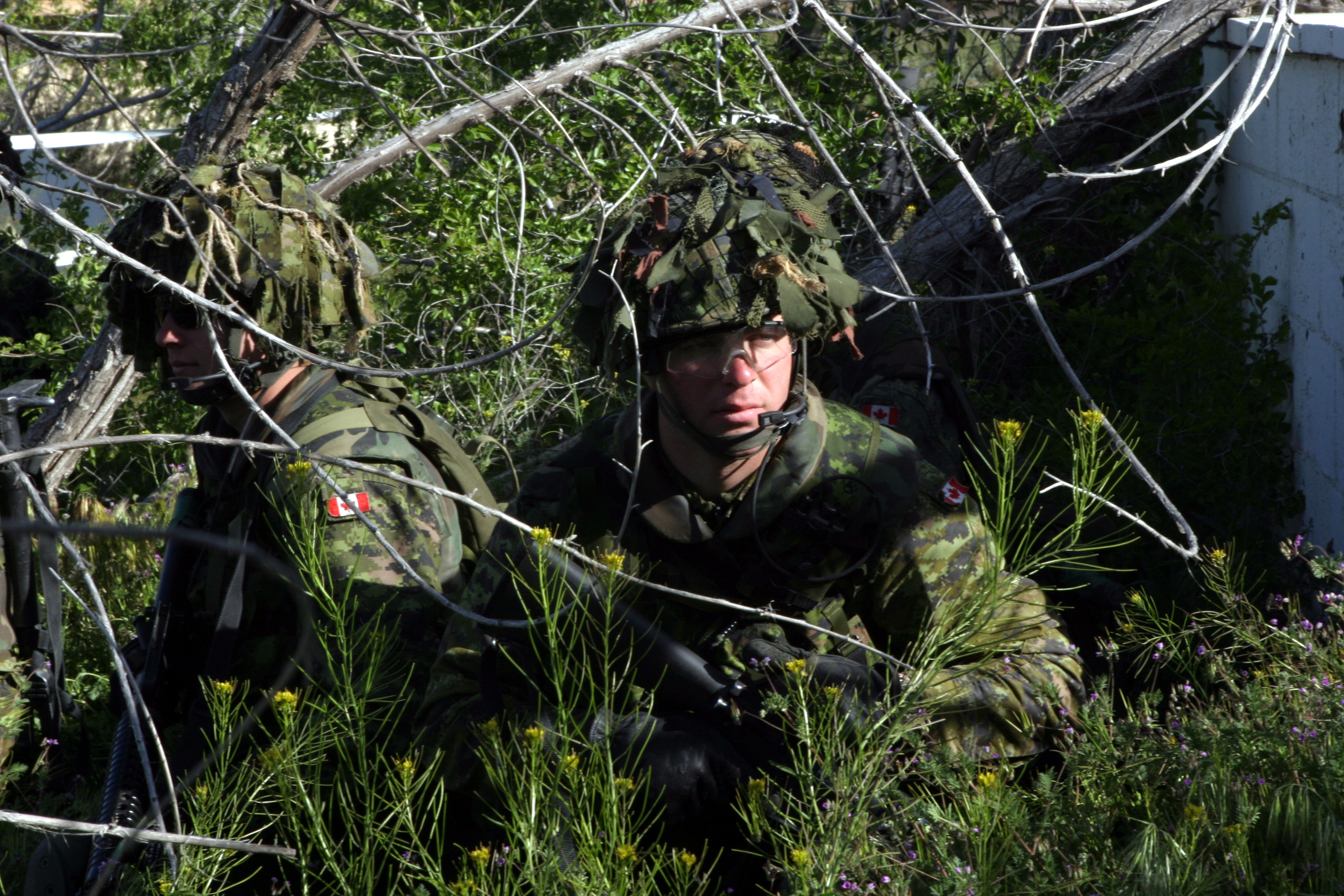
Soldiers of the Canadian Army in CADPAT camouflage uniforms. Camouflaged uniforms are used to make its wearers less visible. The opposite effect is desired in fashion use of camo designs.

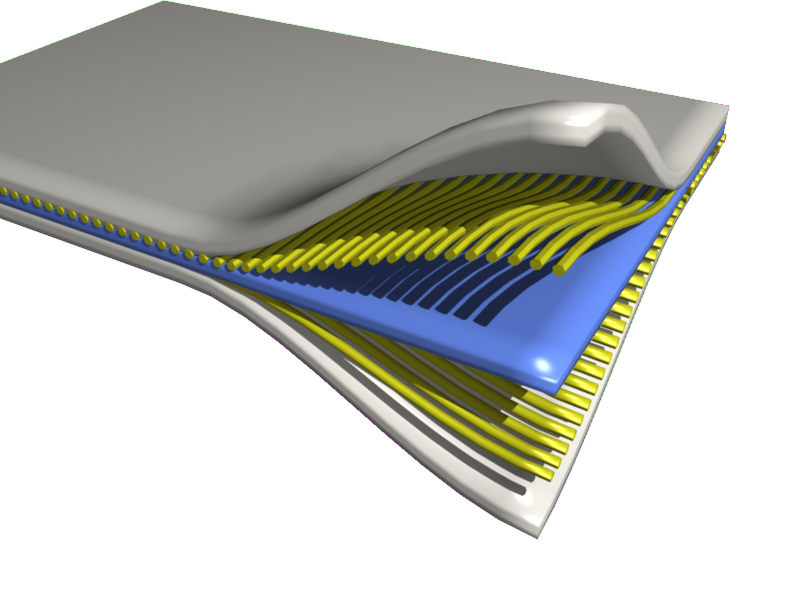
Composites are formed by combining materials together to form an overall structure with properties that differ from that of the individual components.

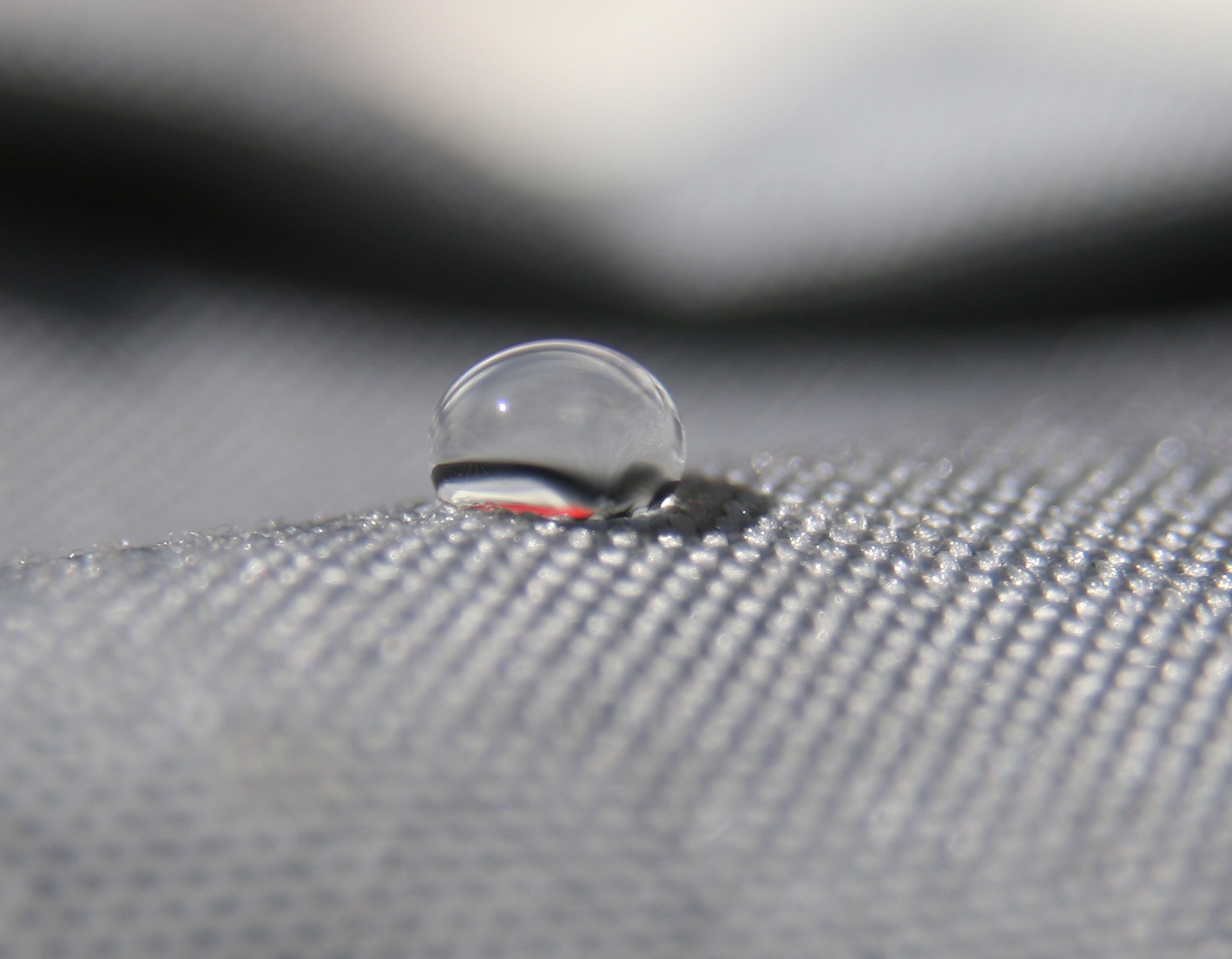
Cloth, treated to be hydrophobic, shows a high contact angle.

Performance of textile products is primarily based on fiber and fabric structure. Fiber properties are fundamentally determined by their physical and chemical properties. Specific finishing methods, functional finishes, fit, and product design could all be used to improve the overall performance of a textile product, allowing it to achieve higher performance levels.

Performance has an array of characteristics that affect appearance, durability, and comfort. Performance characteristics are in-built or incorporated into the textile materials. For example, technical textiles are classified into twelve separate categories. In which the performance is predetermined, and textiles are manufactured and structured as per the application and end-use. Durable water repellent is another functional finish that makes fabrics resistant to water (hydrophobic).

Clothing insulation is a property that provides thermal insulation for the wearer. A stain-repellent is an added property of fabrics to make them stain resistant. Sun protective clothing aids in the avoidance of both light and harmful UV rays.

There is a whole panoply of properties that relate to material functionality and their use in performance fabric applications. These include, inter alia:

- Abrasion resistance, is the resistance of materials and structures to abrasion can be measured by a variety of test methods.
- Antimicrobial, In textiles is an application of an agent that kills microorganisms or stops their growth.
- Antistatic, is an application of a compound used for treatment of materials or their surfaces in order to reduce or eliminate buildup of static electricity.
- Air permeability is a fabric's ability to allow air to pass through it. While air permeable fabrics tend to have relatively high moisture vapor transmission, it is not compulsory to be air permeable to be breathable.
- Breathability, the capacity of a fabric to transmit moisture vapour.
- Biodegradable, is important for sustainability, it is the breakdown of organic matter by microorganisms, such as bacteria and fungi. Natural fibers are easily biodegradable, hence more sustainable.
- Bioresorbable
- Bomb suit, is a specialized body armor for protection from explosions.
- Colour fastness, characterizes a material's colour's resistance to fading or running.
- Conductive
- Crease and wrinkle resistance are textiles that have been treated to resist external stress and hold their shape. Clothing made from this fabric does not need to be ironed and may be sold as non-iron, no-iron, wash and wear, durable press, and easy care. While fabric cleaning and maintenance may be simplified, some wearers experience decreased comfort.
- Dimensional stability (fabric), also known as shrinkage in fabrics is the change of dimensions in textile products when they are washed or relaxed.
- Durable water repellent, is a functional finish to make fabrics water-resistant (hydrophobic).
- Enhanced coloration
- Flame and heat resistance, are textiles that are more resistant to fire than others through chemical treatment or manufactured fireproof fibers.
- Fluorescence Fluorescent compounds are often used to enhance the appearance of fabric and paper, causing a "whitening" effect. In this scenario, an optical brightener can make an already-white surface appear brighter. The blue light emitted by the brightener compensates for the diminishing blue of the treated material and changes the hue away from yellow or brown and toward white. Optical brighteners are used in laundry detergents, high brightness paper, cosmetics, high-visibility clothing and more.
- Hand feel, the property of fabrics related to the touch that express sensory comfort. It refers to the way fabrics feel against the skin or in the hand and conveys information about the cloth's softness and smoothness.
- Heated clothing is a type of clothing designed for cold-weather sports and activities, such as motorcycle riding, downhill skiing, diving, winter biking, and snowmobiling, trekking and for outdoor workers such as construction workers and carpenters.
- High-visibility clothing is a type of safety clothing.
- Hydrophilicity
- Hydrophobicity
- Light responsive, Light reflective
- Luminescence
- Oleophobicity
- Pilling is generally considered an undesirable trait. There are applications that can resist pilling (a surface defect of textiles) caused by wearing.
- Racing suit is a kind of fire suit due to its fire retardant properties, is clothing such as overalls worn in various forms of auto racing by racing drivers, crew members.
- Reinforcement
- Sauna suit is a garment made from waterproof fabric designed to make the wearer sweat profusely.
- Space suit is a garment worn to keep a human alive in the harsh environment of outer space, vacuum and temperature extremes.
- Stain resistance is a property of fabrics in which they repel stains.
- Thermal insulation
- Thermal responsive
- Ultrafiltration
- Ultraviolet resistance
- Waterproof fabrics are those that are naturally resistant to water and wetting, or have been treated to be so.

=== Fiber properties—built in (natural) properties ===
In terms of performance, wool has been advertised as a "miracle fabric" as it naturally possesses a variety of functional properties, including stretch, warmth, water absorption, flame retardance, and the ability to wick away body moisture. Additionally, Merino wool has the ability to protect from harmful UV rays. Natural and synthetic fibers have various properties that influence the final textile performance. Most of the natural fibers are suited for comfort, where synthetics are better for aesthetics and durability.

- Cotton, wool and linen are naturally absorbent fibers.
- Linen has luster.
- Most commonly used synthetic fibers, such as nylon, polyester, polypropylene, and elastane, are hydrophobic and thermoplastic.
- Elastane is a polyether-polyurea copolymer that is exceptionally elastic.

=== Added or additional properties ===
Additional properties are properties other than the inherent properties of the textiles which are specifically added in accordance with the specific needs. They may be added during different textile manufacturing steps from fiber to fabric.

==== High-performance fibers ====
High-performance fibers are specifically synthesized to achieve unique properties such as higher heat resistance, exceptional strength, high strength-to-weight ratio, stiffness, tensile strength, chemical or fire resistance. These high-performance fibers are used in protective clothing (PPE) with exceptional characteristics like chemical resistance and fire resistance.

- Aramid fiber, namely Kevlar, a strong, abrasion-resistant, durable material with high performance. Fiber and fabric engineering can optimize the functionality of the materials. Kevlar and Nomex which is a flame-resistant meta-aramid material, are used together in advanced bomb suits. The suit helps bomb disposal soldiers from threats associated with improvised explosive devices, including those related to fragmentation, blast overpressure, impact, heat, and flame.
- Carbon fibers have several advantages including high stiffness, high tensile strength, low weight to strength ratio, high chemical resistance, high temperature tolerance and low thermal expansion.
- Polybenzimidazole fiber, also known as PBI, has high thermal stability, flame resistance, and moisture recovery, making it suitable for use in protective clothing. PBI are usually yellow to brown solid infusible up to 400 °C or higher. PBI is also used in Space suits. In 1969, the United States Air Force selected polybenzimidazole (PBI) for its superior thermal protective performance after a 1967 fire aboard the Apollo 1 spacecraft killed three astronauts. In the early 1970s USAF laboratories experimented with polybenzimidazole fibers for protective clothing to reduce aircrew deaths from fires.
- Silicon carbide fiber composed of Silicon carbide is used for bulletproof vests.
- UHMWPE (Ultra-high-molecular-weight polyethylene) is a high abrasion and wear resistance material suitable for durability, low friction, and chemical resistance.

==== Finishing methods ====
Finishing improves appearance and performance.

===== Finish =====
Textile finishing is the process of converting the loomstate or raw goods into a useful product, which can be done mechanically or chemically. Finishing is a broad term that refers to a variety of physical and chemical techniques and treatments that finish one stage of textile production while also preparing for the next. Textile finishing can include aspects like improving surface feel, aesthetical enhancement, and adding advanced chemical finishes. A finish is any process that transforms unfinished products into finished products. This includes mechanical finishing and chemical applications which alter the composition of treated textiles (fiber, yarn or fabric.) Mechanical finish purports machine finishes such as embossing, heat setting, sanforizing, sheering, various, luster imparting, surface finishes, and glaze finishes.

Chemical finishing refers to the process of applying and treating textiles with a variety of chemicals in order to achieve desired functional properties. Chemical finishing of textiles is a part of the textile finishing process where the emphasis is on chemical substances instead of mechanical finishing. Chemical finishing in textiles also known as wet finishing. Chemical finishing adds properties to the treated textiles. These properties may vary from Normal to Advanced or High Tech. Softening of textiles, durable water repellancy and wrinkle free fabric finishes are examples of chemical finishing.

Cravenette was an old chemical finish of the early 20th century that makes cloths water repellant.

==== Functional finishes or special purpose finishes ====
The first modern waterproof raincoat was created following the patent by Scottish chemist Charles Macintosh in 1824 of new tarpaulin fabric, described by him as "India rubber cloth," and made by sandwiching a rubber softened by naphtha between two pieces of fabric. Application of performance finishes are not a new concept; oilcloth is the first known coated fabric. Boiling linseed oil is used to make oilcloth. Boiling oils have been used from the year 200 AD. The "special purpose finishes" or ''Performance finishes'' are that improve the performance of textiles for a specific end-use. Performance finishing contributes to a variety of areas. These finishes enable treated textiles with different characteristics, which may be opposite to their natural or inherent nature. Functional finishes add value other than hand feel and aesthetics. Certain finishes can alter the performance suiting for thermal comfort (thermal regulation), antimicrobial, UV protection, easy care (crease resistant cotton fabrics), and insect repellant etc.

==== Nanotechnology ====
Nanotechnology in textiles is a branch of nano-science in which molecular systems at the nano-scale of size (1–100 nanometre) are applied in the field of textiles to improve performance or add functions to textiles. Nanotechnology unites a variety of scientific fields, such as material science, physics, chemistry, biology and engineering. For example: Nanocoating (of microscopically structured surfaces fine enough to interfere with visible light) in textiles for biomimetics is the new method of structural coloration without dyes.

See further Nanofabrics

===== Surface tension biomimetics =====
Surface tension biomimetics is a phenomenon of exploitation of biomimetics properties to create functional effects such as shark skin, and lotus leaf that have the ability to repel water and self-cleaning. In textiles, surfaces with hydrophobic or hydrophilic properties are formed with the help of coatings and applied finishes.

==== Surface treatments ====
Certain technologies can alter the surface characterizations of textiles.

==== Plasma ====
Plasma is a highly reactive state that activates the substrate, and the oxidized surface of the plasma-treated textile improves dyeing while reducing environmental impacts. Plasma can also be used to treat textiles to obtain waterproofing and oil repellent properties. Different gases in the same fiber may have other effects, and various gases are chosen for different results.

Plasma process with	By using chemical element	Result on treated textile
Noble gas	Helium, argon	Etching
Oxidizing	Oxygen, carbon dioxide, water	Cleaning, functionalisation and etching
Hydrocarbon	Nitrogen or oxygen containing hydrocarbons	Plasma polymerization

==== Laser ====
Light amplification by stimulated emission of radiation (laser) irradiation is used to modify the structural and surface properties of textiles, as well as to texturize them.

==== 3D textiles ====
3D textiles are used in versatile applications, like military textiles, bulletproof jackets, protective clothing, manufacturing 3D composites, and medical textiles. Examples include 3D spacer fabrics, which are used in treating a wound.

== Testing standards ==
Standards vary with the use and application areas. Military textiles, industrial textiles have separate tests to analyze performance in extreme conditions. The American National Standards Institute approves the textile performance standards set by ASTM International. Other testing agencies or bodies which are recognized or accepted as international standards depending on the contracts:

	Standards organisation
ASTM	ASTM International
AATCC	American Association of Textile Chemists and Colorists
BS	British Standards
ISO	International Organization for Standardization
IWTO	International Wool Textile Organisation
EN	European Standard
Oekotex	Oeko-Tex
AS/NZS	

=== Special test methods ===
The comfort performance of textiles is the foremost requirement that influences product acceptance. Following comfort, safety and protection are the top priorities. Numerous tests are conducted to evaluate the performance of textiles.

==== Sweating guarded hot plate test ====
The test method evaluates the thermal resistance and water vapor permeability of fabrics, which bear on the garment's comfort.

- ISO 11092:2014 (the test for physiological effects — Test for measuring thermal resistance and water-vapor resistance)
- ASTM F1868 (test for measuring thermal and evaporative resistance)

==== Breathability test ====
Water vapor transmission rate also called moisture vapor transmission rate (MVTR) is a method of testing or measuring the permeability for vapor barriers.

- ASTM F2298 – 03 (test for clothing materials such as protective clothing, laminates, and membranes) a similar test by Japanese Standards Association is JSA – JIS L 1099.

==== Air permeability ====
The air permeability test method is for measuring the ability of air to pass through textile materials.

- ASTM D737-96 alternative test method is
- ISO 9237:1995

==== Moisture management test ====
The moisture wicking or moisture management test is for testing moisture management properties such as wicking capabilities and drying efficiencies.

- AATCC test method 195
- ISO 13029:2012

==== Qmax test ====
The Qmax test method is used to evaluate the surface warm-cool sensations of fabric and to indicate the instantaneous thermal feeling sensed when the fabric first comes into contact with the skin surface.

==== Manikin test ====
A thermal manikin is a device for analysing the thermal interface of the human body and its environment. It assesses the thermal comfort and insulation properties of clothing, such as protective gear for the military.

==== Kawabata evaluation system ====
Kawabata evaluation system measures the mechanical properties of the textiles such as tensile strength, shear strength, surface friction and roughness, The Kawabata evaluation system predicts human responses and understands the perception of softness. Additionally, it can be used to determine the transient heat transfer properties associated with the sensation of coolness generated when fabrics come into contact with the skin while being worn.

== Gallery ==
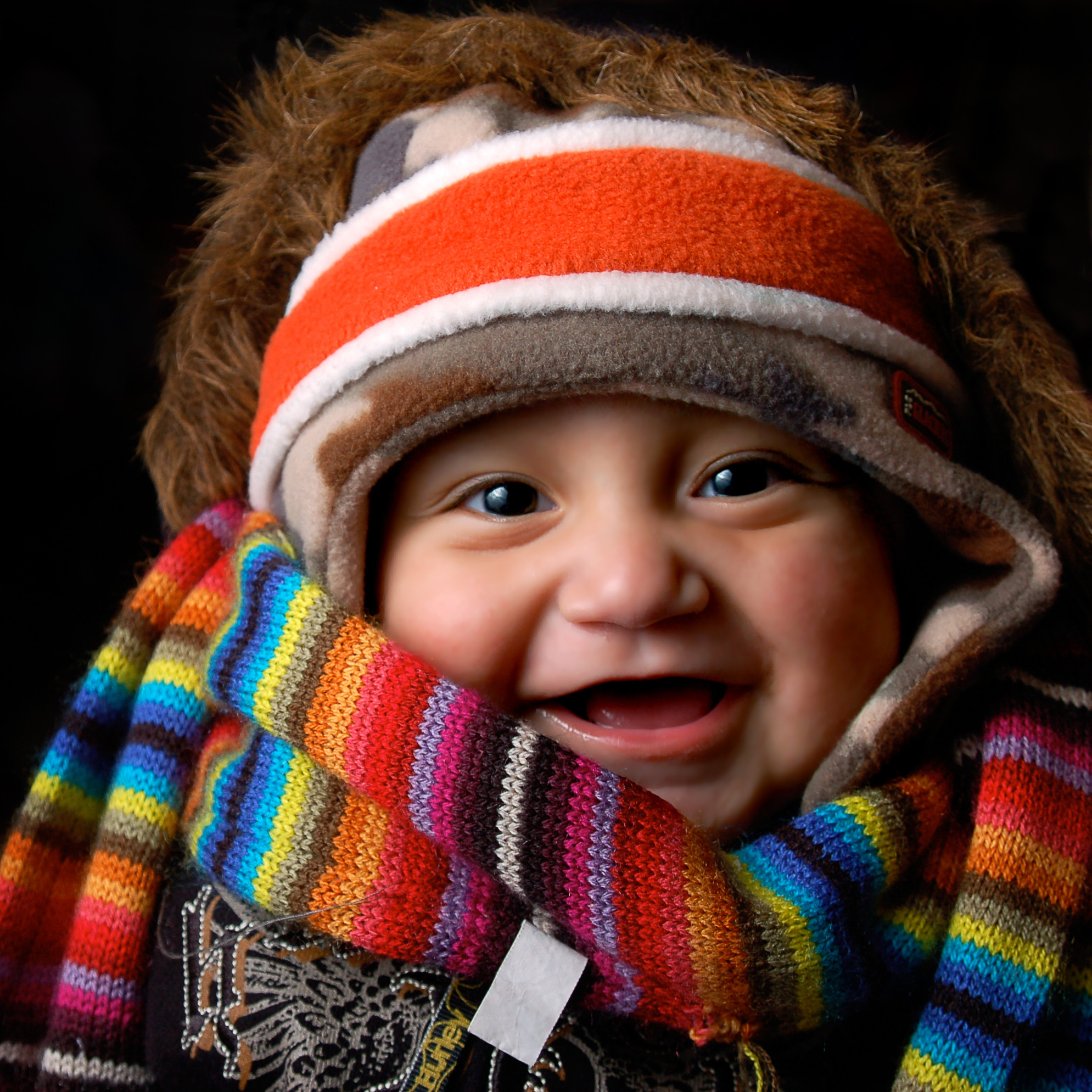
A baby wearing many items of soft winter clothing: headband, cap, fur-lined coat, scarf and sweater, expressing comfort of clothing

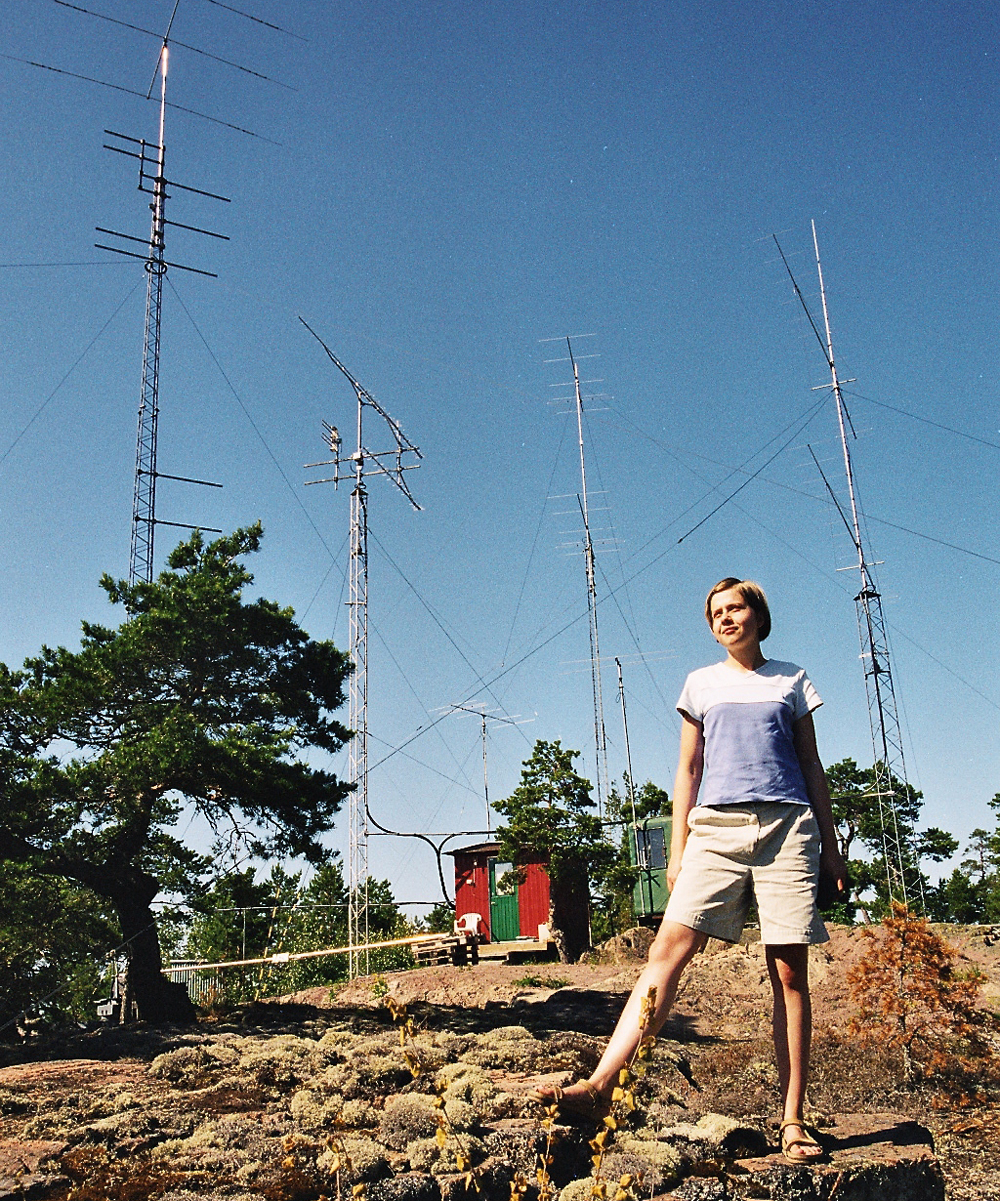
A young woman wearing t-shirt and shorts at the warm summer in Åland

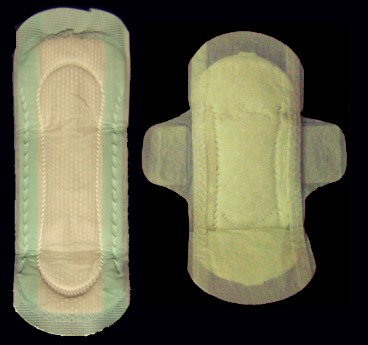
The functional properties of fabrics for sanitary napkins include wickability, moisture retention, monodirectional moisture transmission, softness.

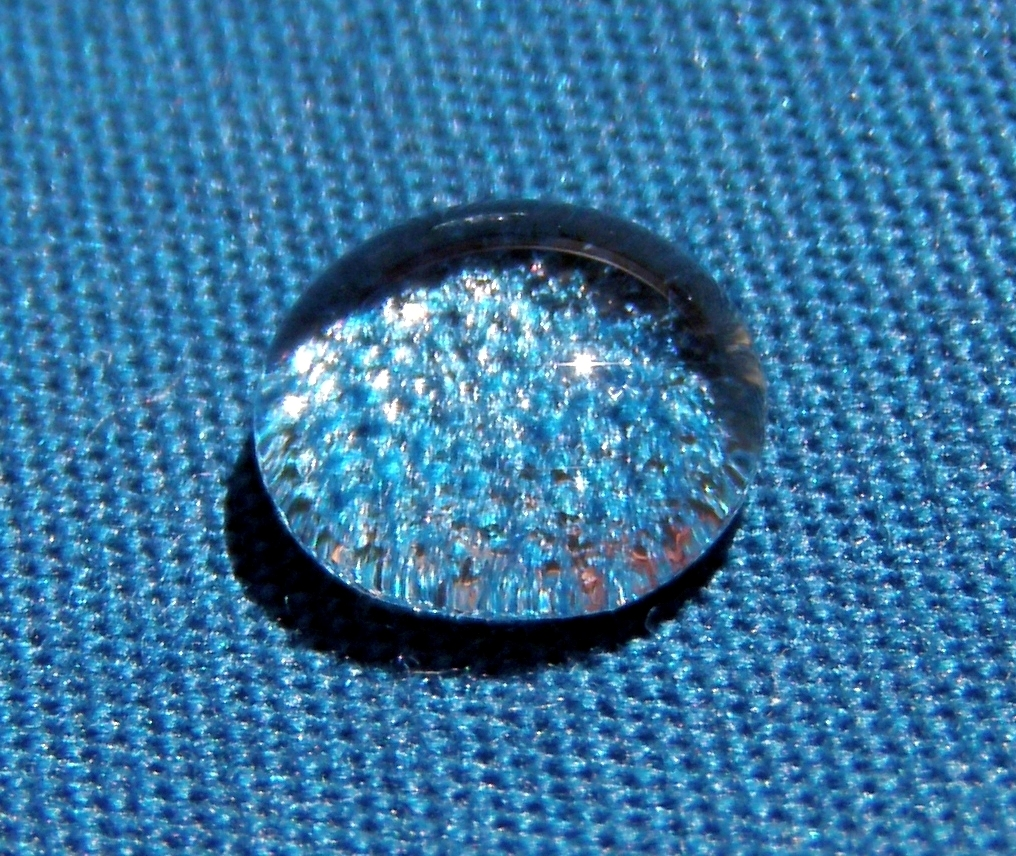
Fluorine-containing durable water repellent makes a fabric water-resistant.

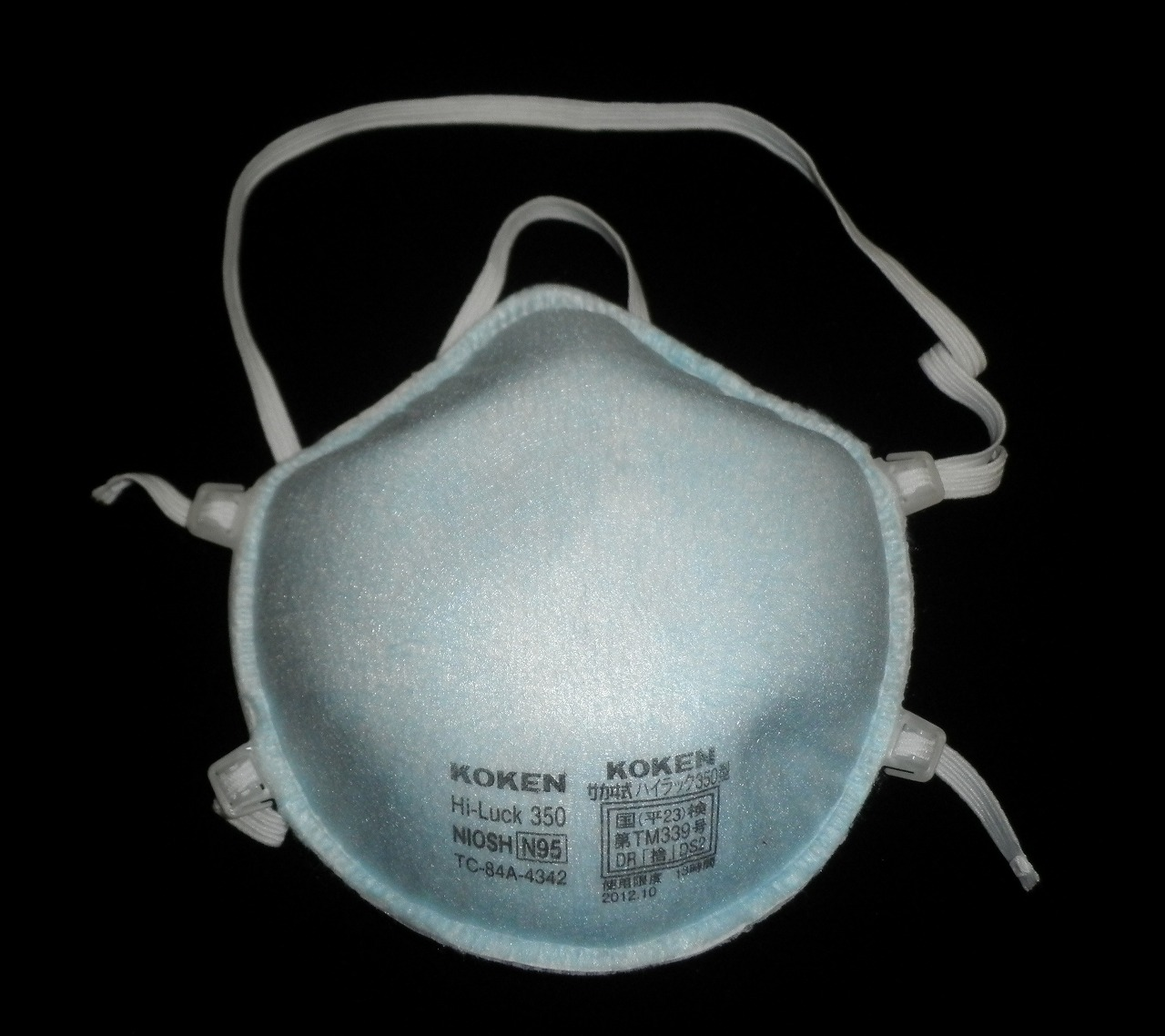
N95 mask

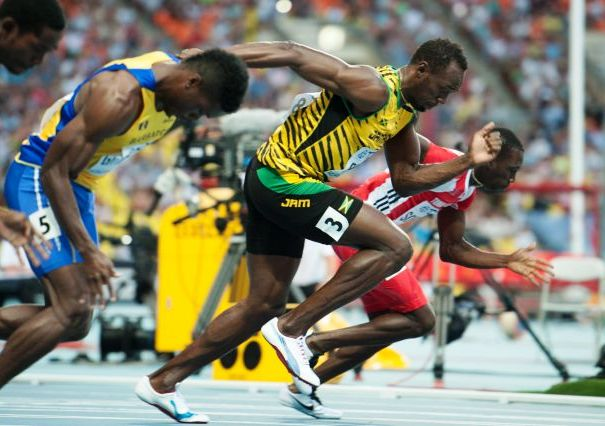
100 m race record holder Usain Bolt (in yellow) and other runners in sportswear

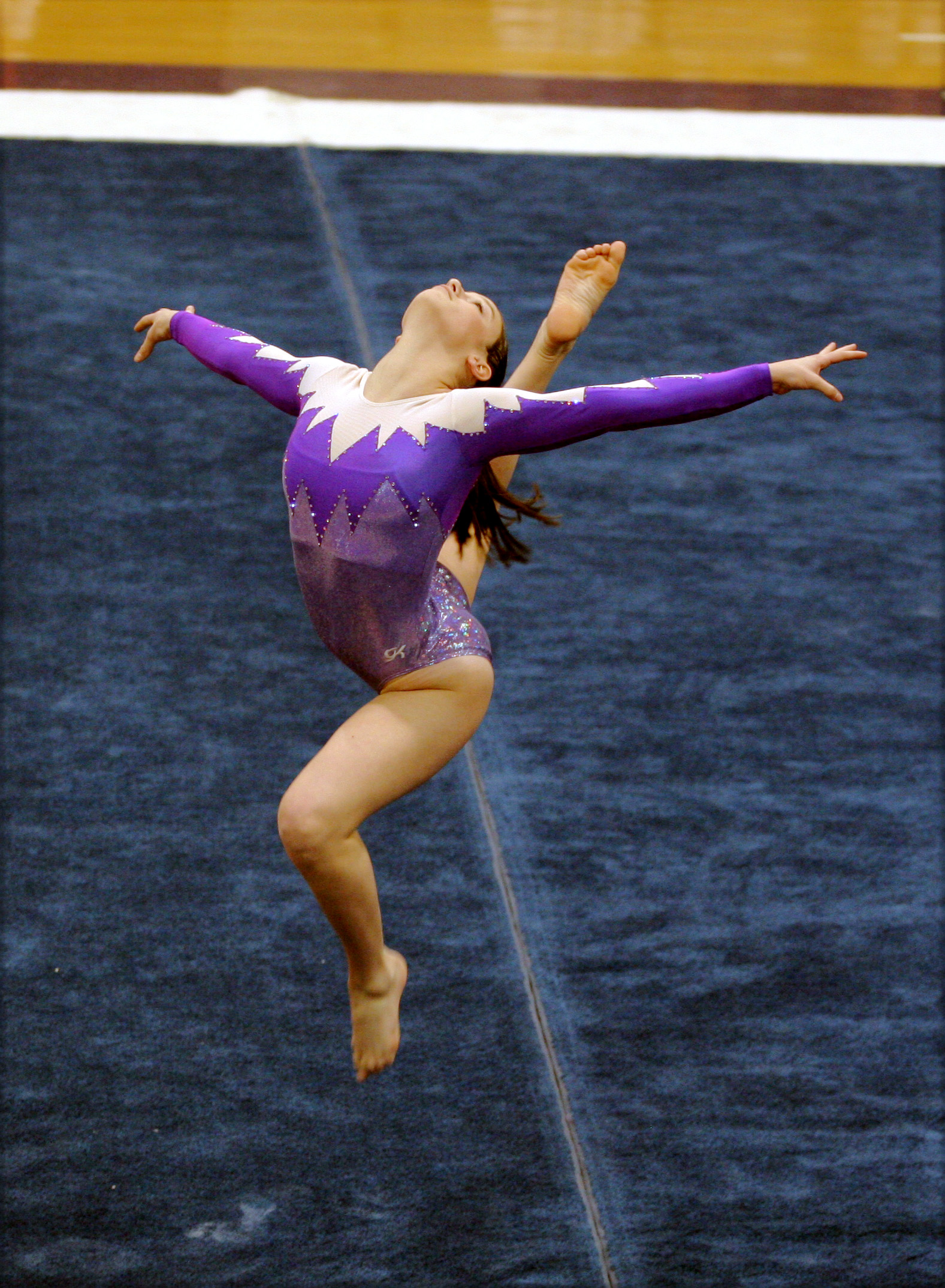
Enhanced moveability with Elastane

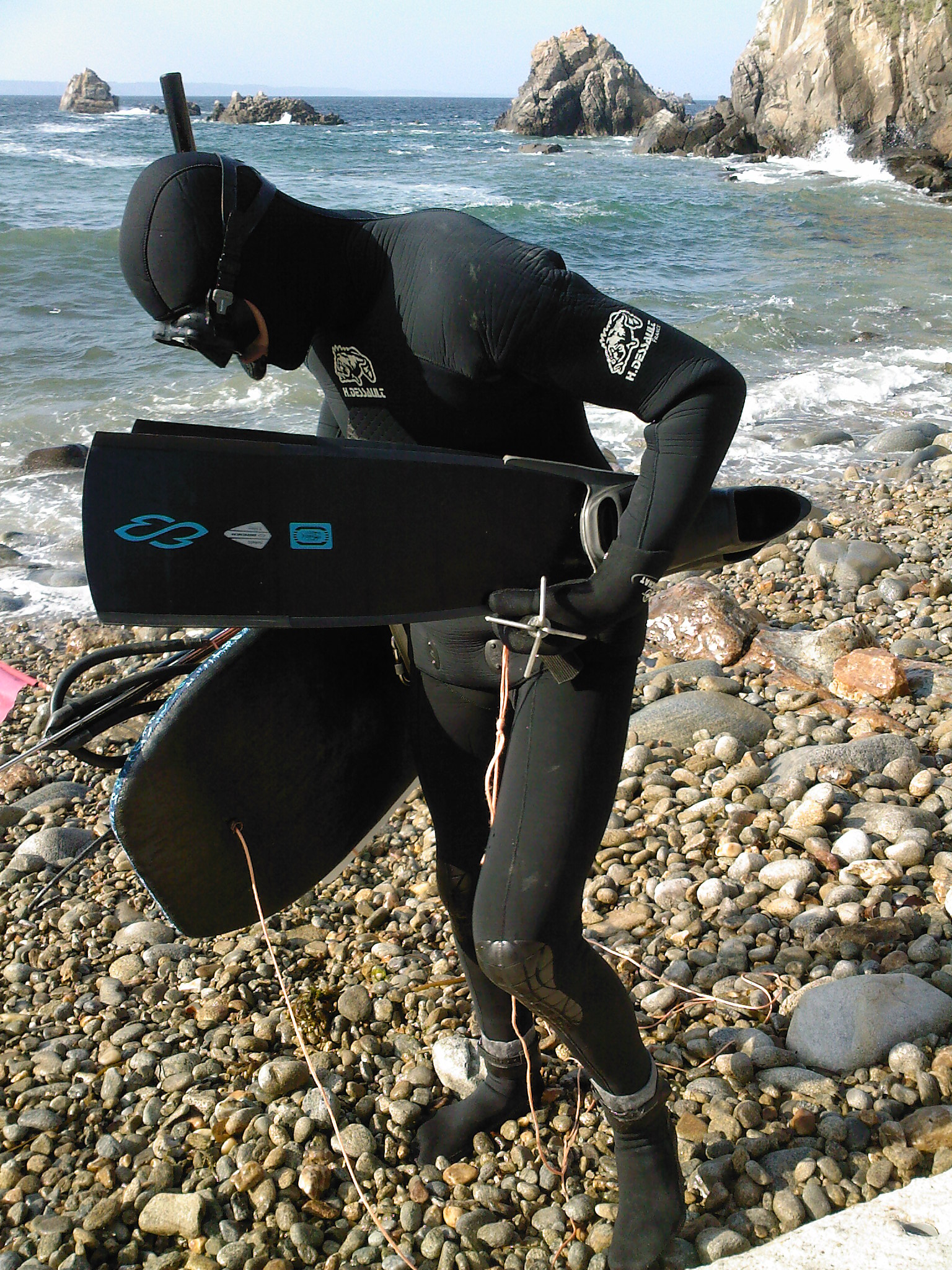
Spearfisher in wet suit

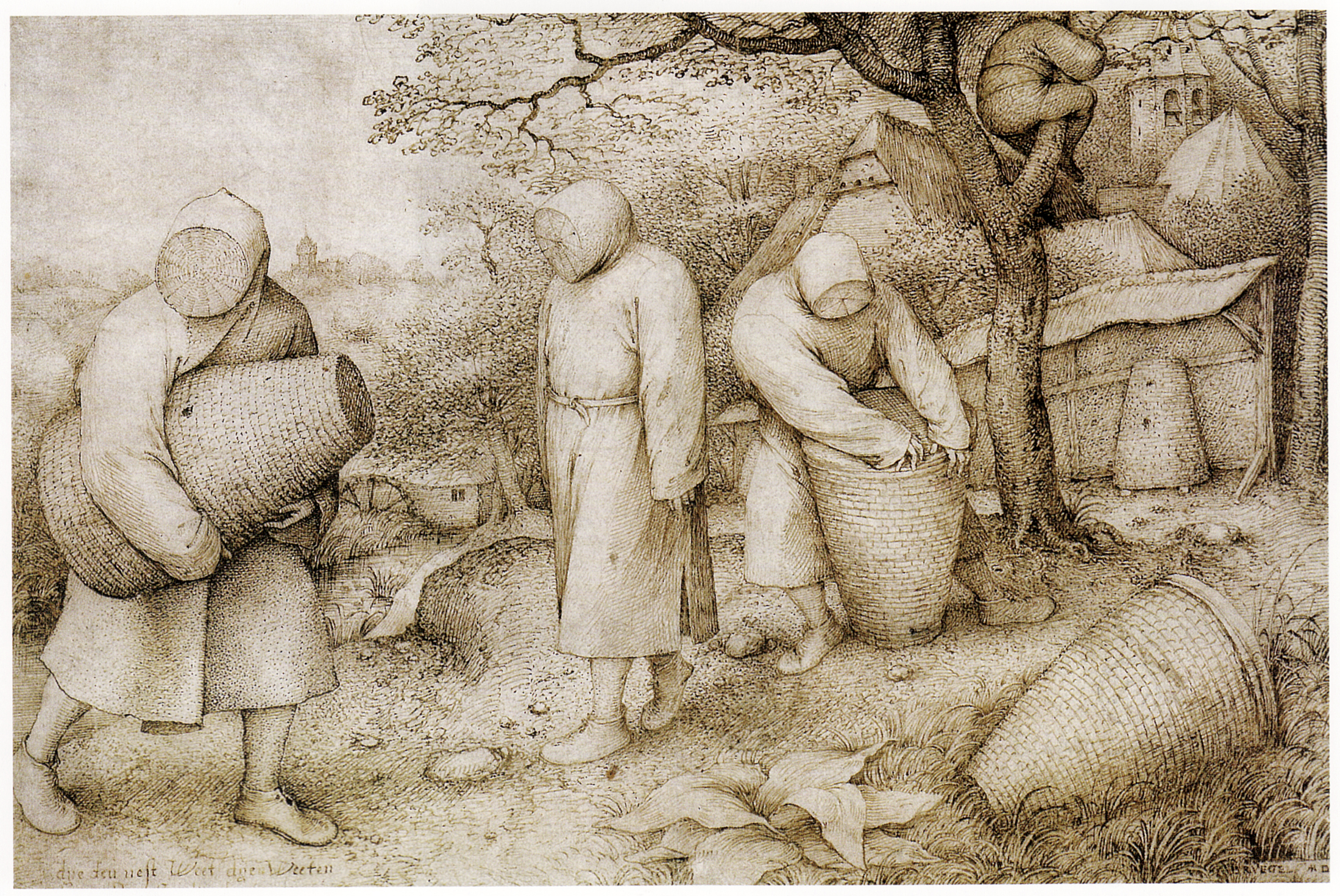
A 1568 painting depicting beekeepers in protective clothing, by Pieter Brueghel the Elder

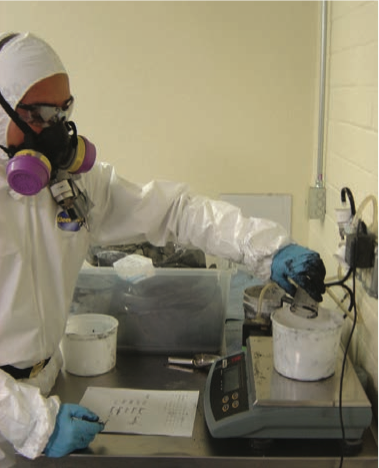
A worker wearing a respirator, lab coat, and gloves while weighing carbon nanotubes

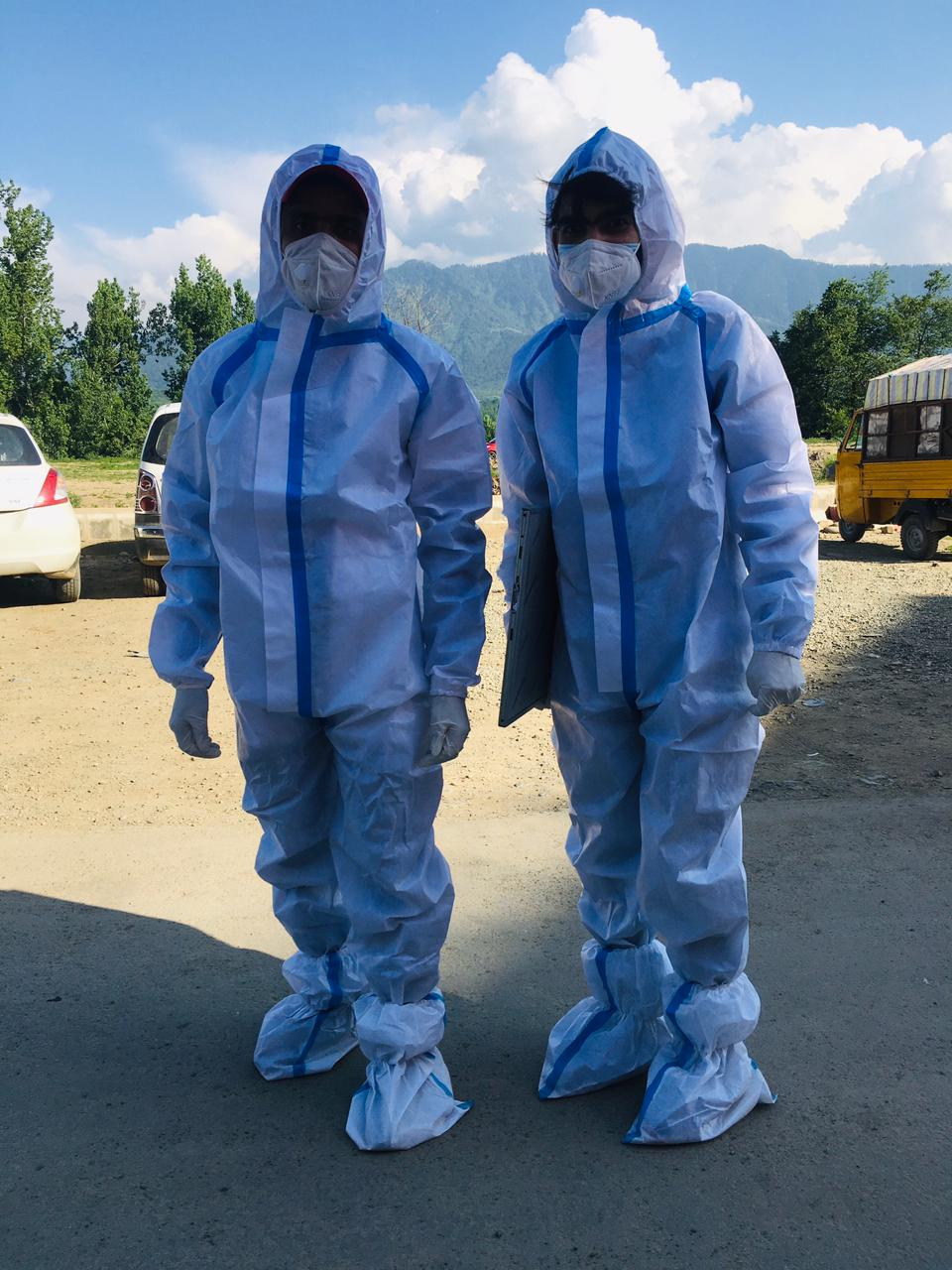
Medical PPE gowns worn by medical personnel during the COVID-19 pandemic

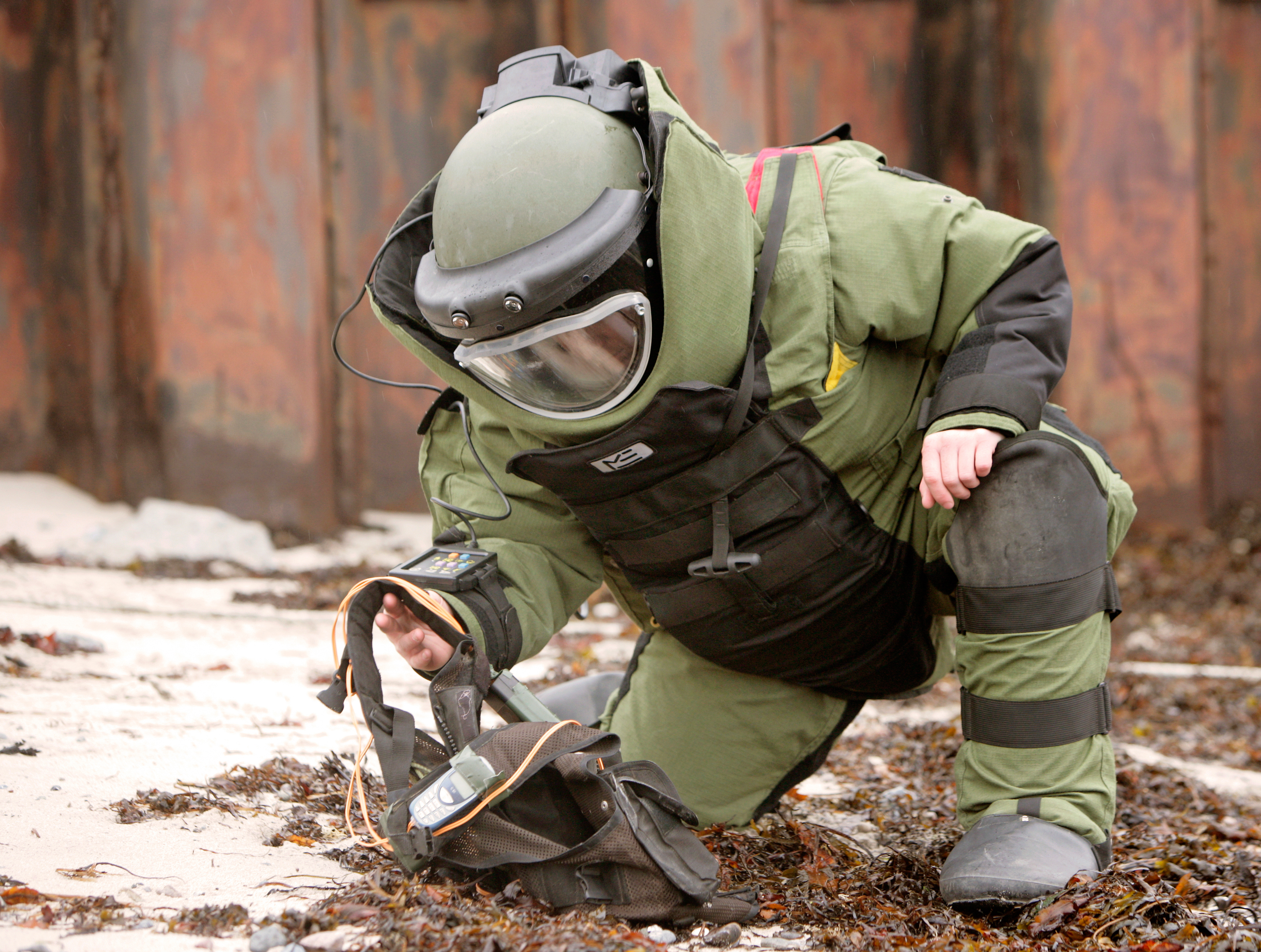
An EOD technician wearing a bomb suit

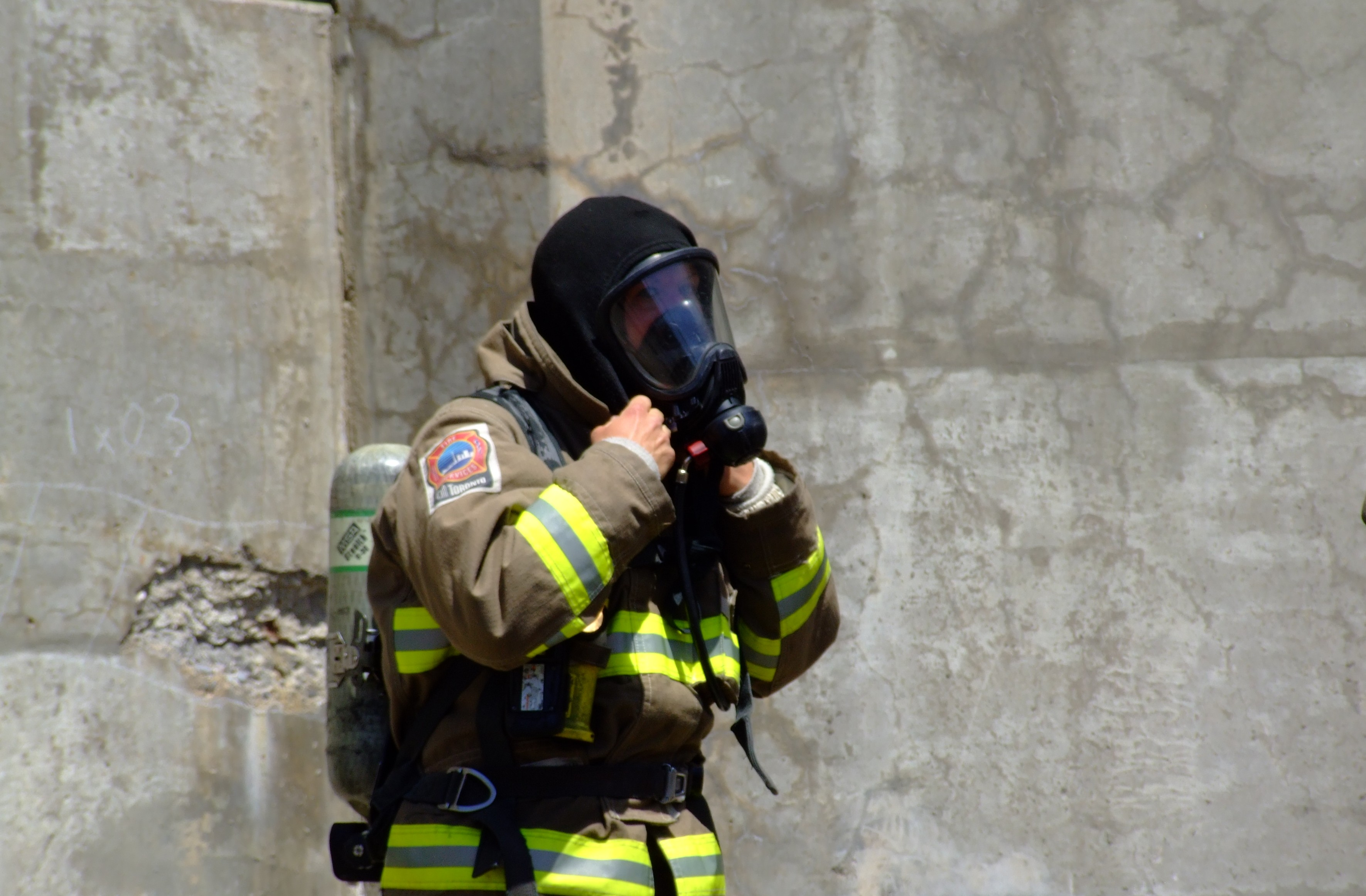
A firefighter in Toronto, Canada, wears a Nomex hood in 2007.

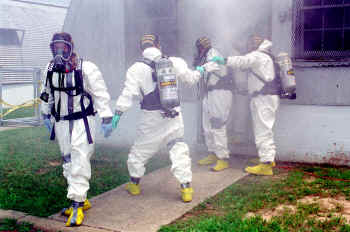
DEA agents wearing Level B hazmat suits

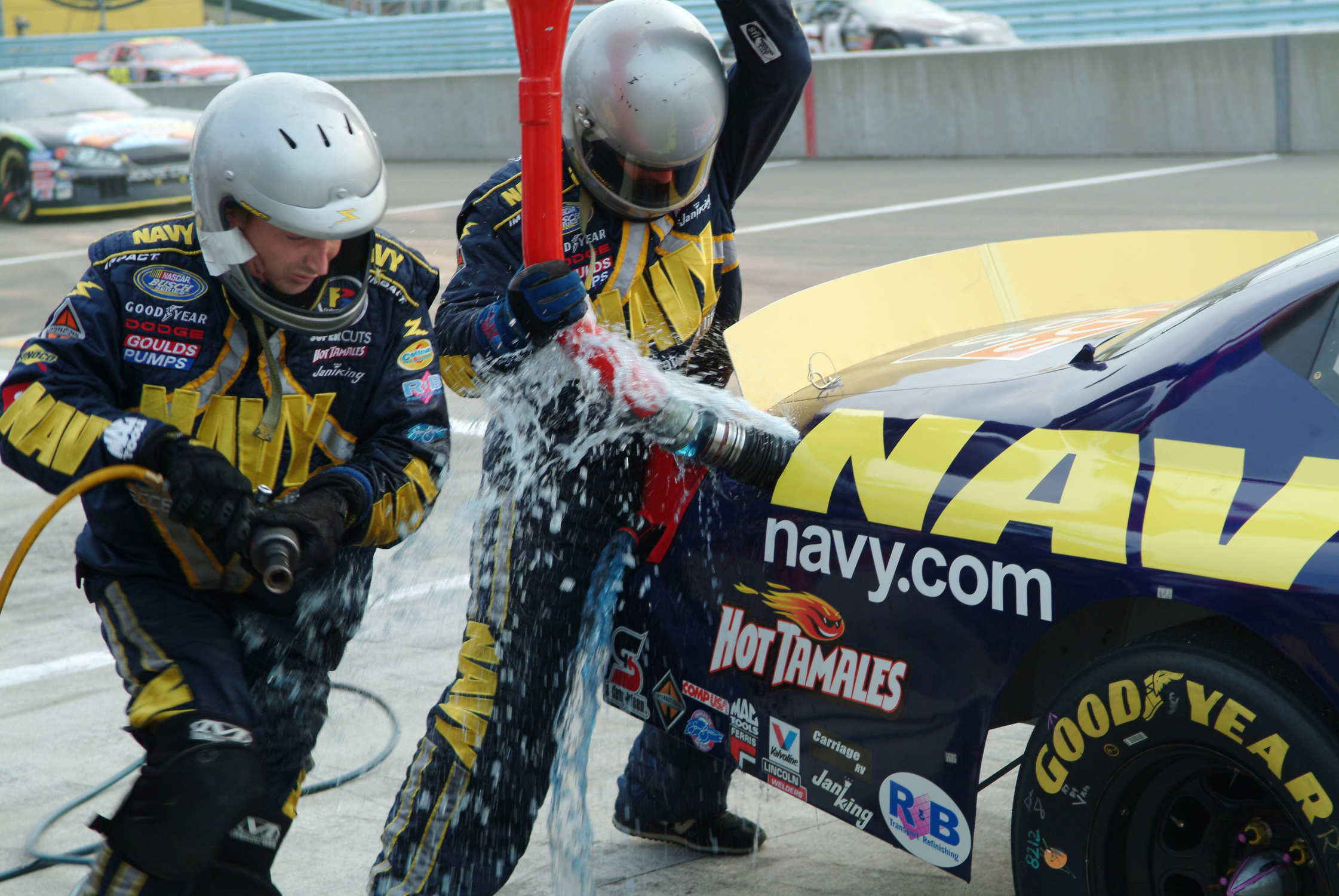
Fuel spills from the gas tank as pit crew members wear PPE.

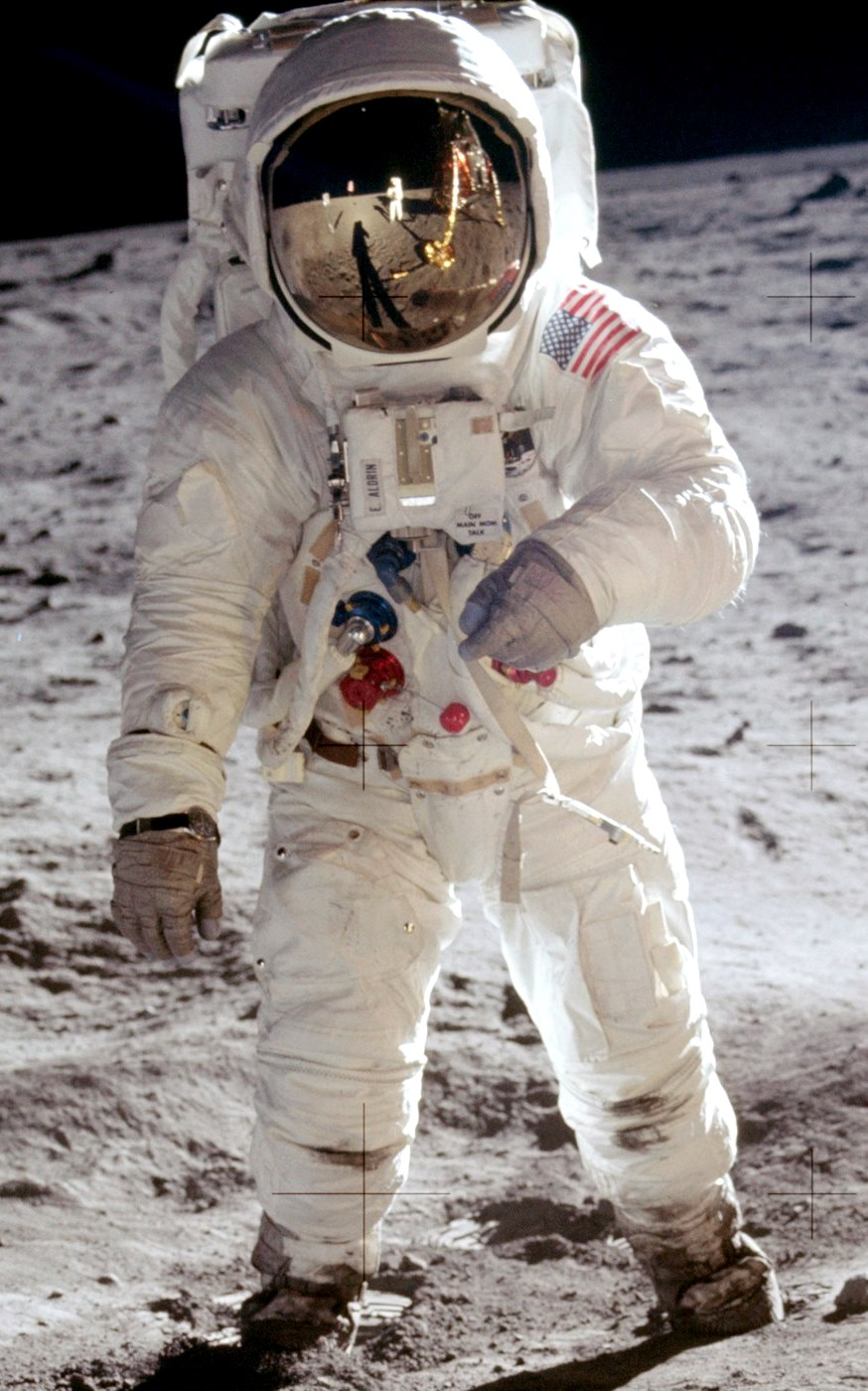
Apollo spacesuit worn by astronaut Buzz Aldrin on Apollo 11

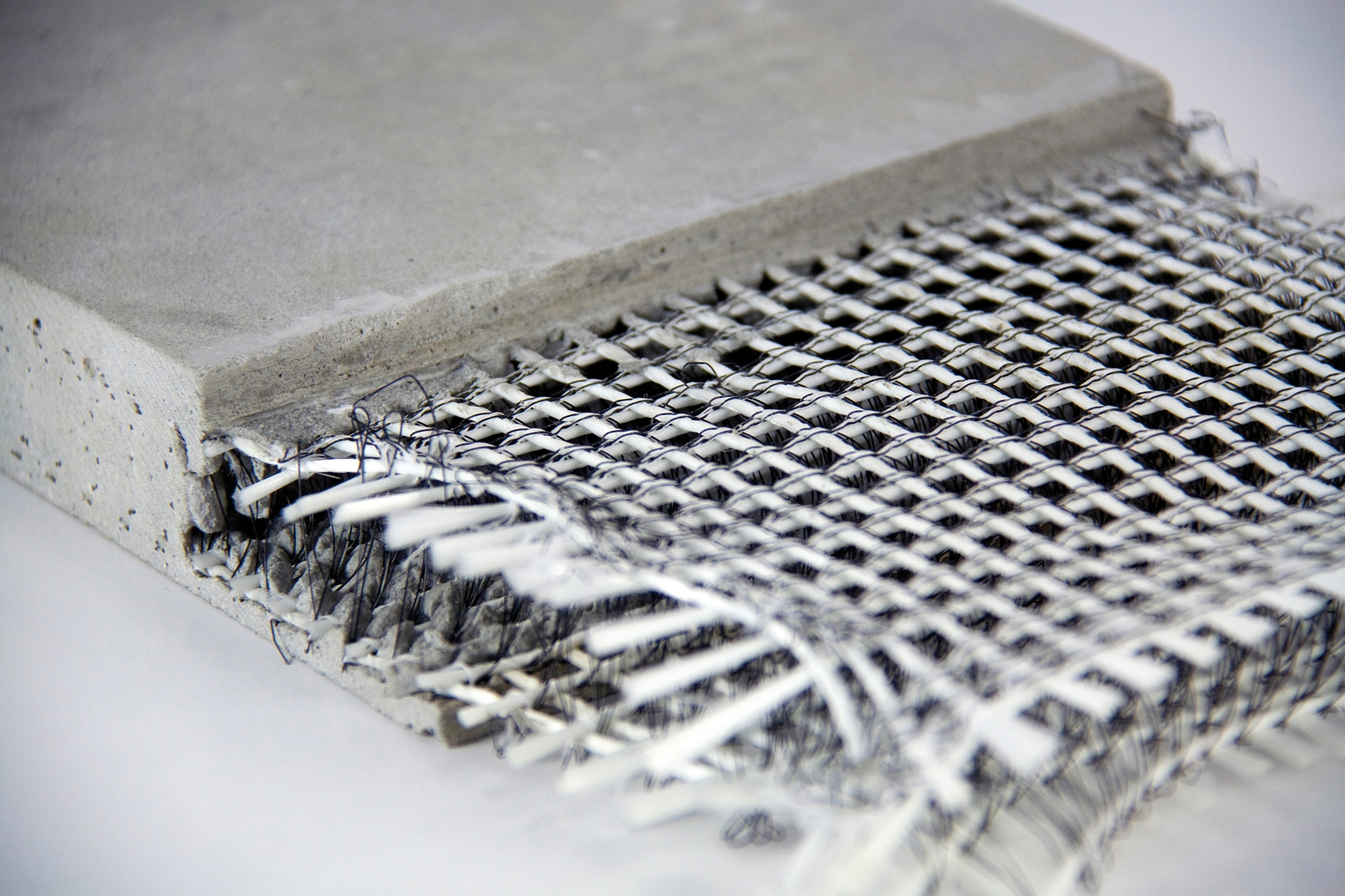
Close-up of a piece of textile-reinforced concrete

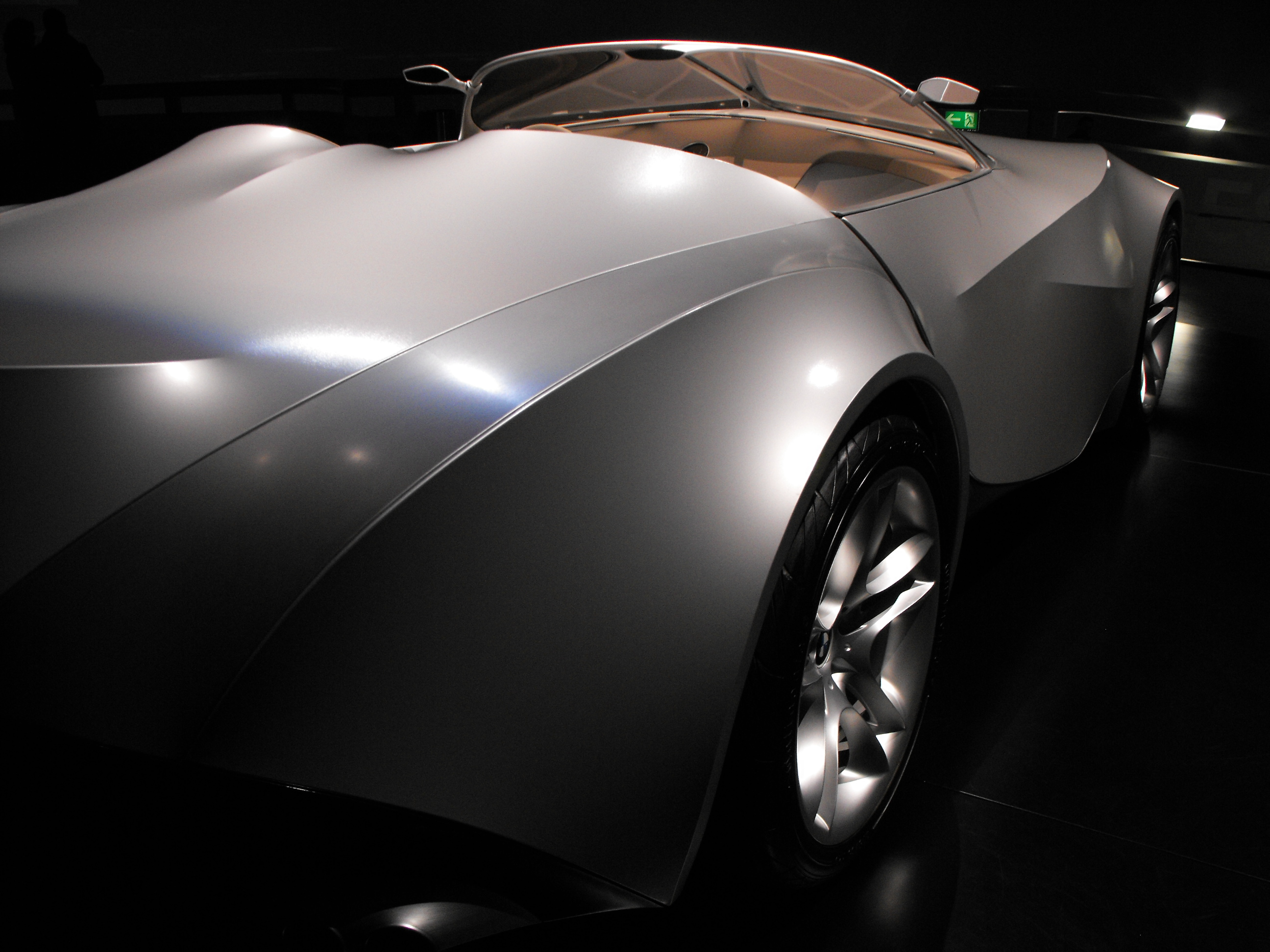
Rear view of BMW GINA a fabric body car. BMW GINA is a fabric-skinned shape-shifting sports car concept built by BMW.

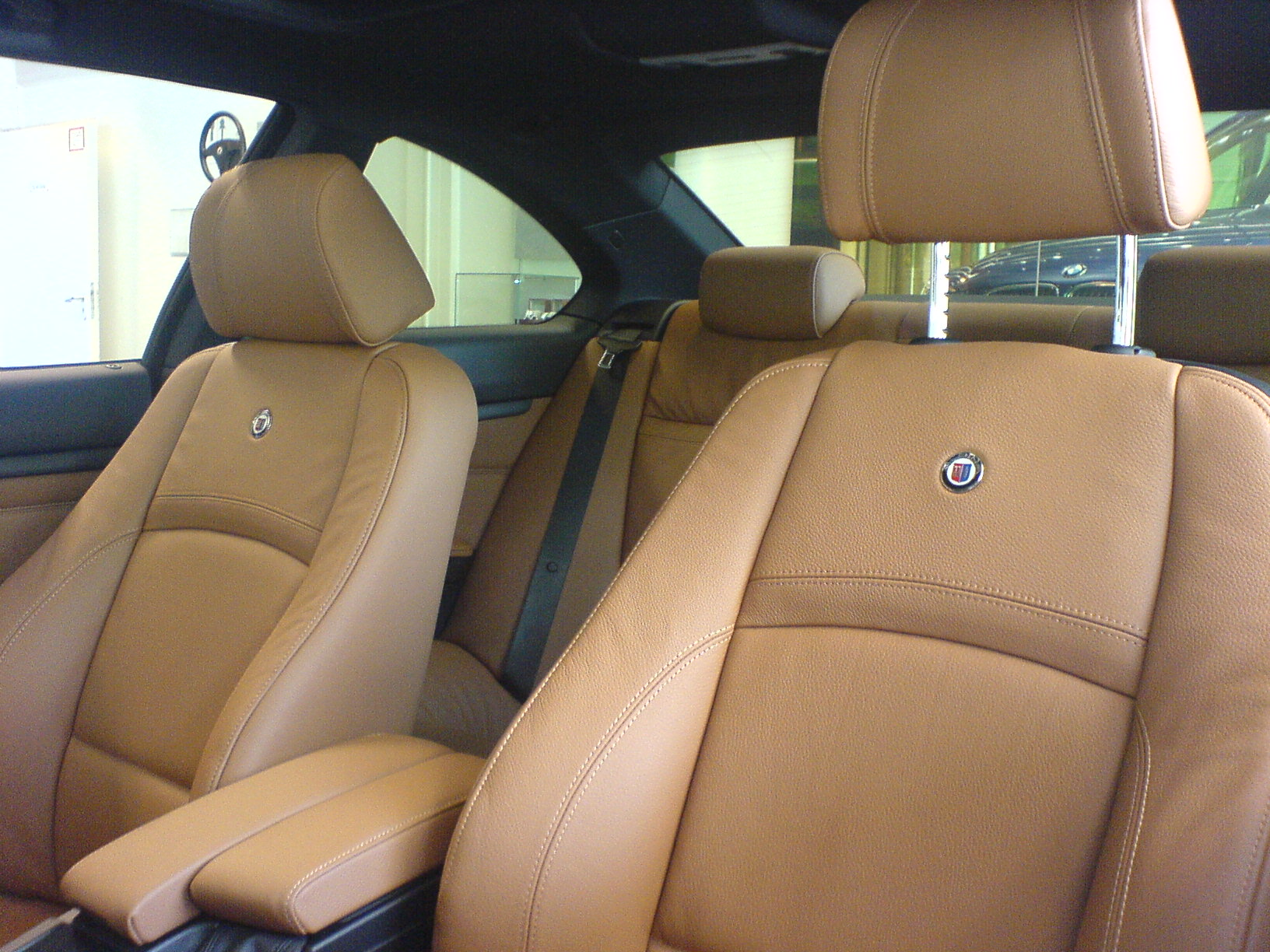
Front bucket seats in a BMW Alpina Automotive textiles

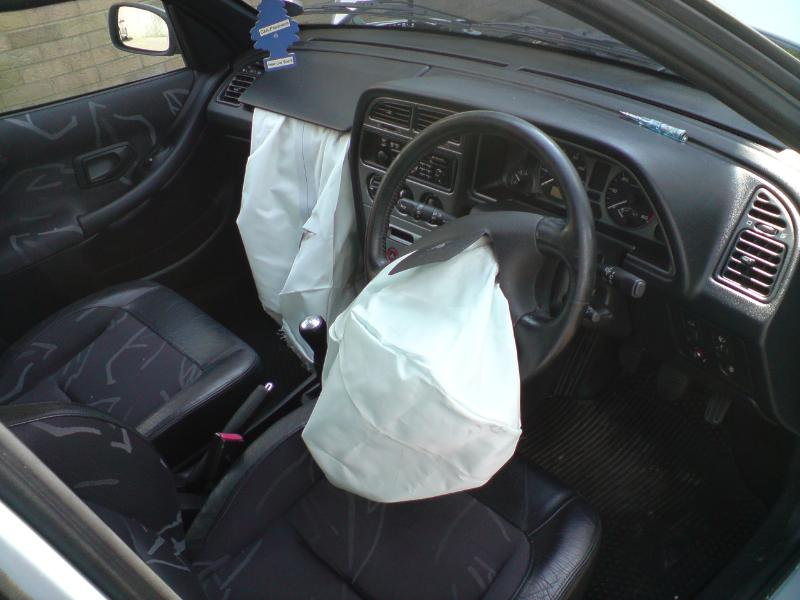
Deflated airbags

== See also ==
- Clothtech, technical textiles for clothing and footwear applications.
- Composite materials
- Clothing physiology
