= Clothtech =

Technical textiles for clothing and footwear

Clothtech (clothing textiles) is a segment of technical textiles that includes all textile components used primarily in clothing and footwear. Clothtech adds functional properties to the product that improve specific and critical objectives. Clothtech encompasses the functional parts that may not be visible, such as zippers, labels, sewing threads, elastics, insulating fiber fills, waddings, shoelaces, and drawcords velcro, and interlining cloths, etc. Sewing threads is the major component that accounts around 60% of the technical textiles under clothtech followed by labels 19%, interlinings 8%, shoelaces and zip fasteners 5%, Velcro and umbrella 2%.

Clothtech is a significant division of the technical textile sector, contributing 7% to the overall technical textile industry.

== Applications ==
=== Functional clothing ===
Clothtech adds functional properties to the end product that enhance adaptability, elasticity, insulation, resistance, and increase wearing comfort hence the overall performance against predetermined areas. Clothtech adds resistance to water or fire and increases performance with breathability etc. Textiles with cloth tech respond to different stimuli such as the environment, the garments made with cloth tech can detect and transmit the vitals of the user (wearer).

=== Footwear ===
Clothtech is used for various shoe components such as fabric, shoelaces, sole materials, and fillings.

== Use ==
The initial use of clothtech is apparel and footwear. High-performance garments, umbrella cloth Scuba diving, Body armors, firefighting suits are a few examples. Clothtech is one of the primary application areas of twelve direct application areas referred to in technical textiles.

== Manufacturing ==
Clothtech involves careful selection of fibers and a range of treatments (applications in machines such as exhaust, pad, or coatings) in various textile manufacturing stages. Different types of fibers ranging from natural to synthetic are used in clothtech. Woven, nonwoven, braided, and knitted all kinds of fabric manufacturing is selected.

== See also ==
- Automotive textiles
- Technical textile
- Geotextile
- Indutech
- Landscape fabric
- Nonwoven fabric
- Fabric inspection
- Performance (textiles)
- 3D textiles
