= TRJ =

TRJ or trj may refer to:

- Textile Research Journal, a peer-reviewed academic journal published by Sage
- Tarro railway station (station code: TRJ), New South Wales, Australia
- Toram language (ISO 639-3: trj), Chad
- Turkish regional jet project
