= Coated fabrics =

Fabrics that go through a process of coating

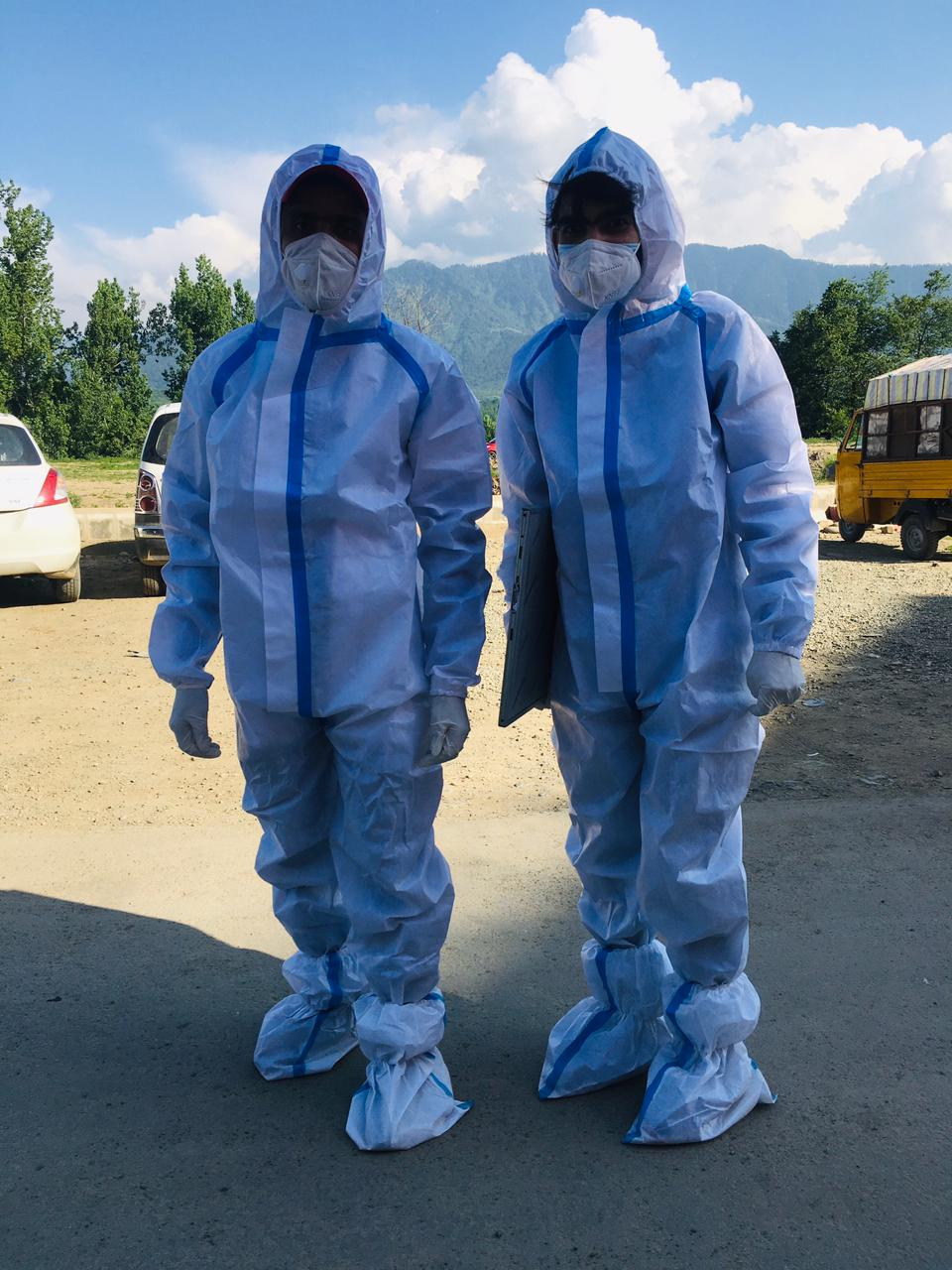
Medical PPE gowns worn by medical personnel during the COVID-19 pandemic

Coated fabrics are those that have undergone a coating procedure to become more functional and hold the added properties, such as cotton fabrics becoming impermeable or waterproof. Coated textiles are used in a variety of applications, including blackout curtains and the development of waterproof fabrics for raincoats.

== Coating ==
The coating is an application of chemical substances on the surface of fabric that is to be made functional or decorative. Coatings use less material than other types of applications, such as exhaust or padding on stenter.

== History ==
The earliest known coated fabric is Oilcloth. Oilcloth is produced by the application of boiled linseed oil. The use of boiled oils can be traced back to 200 AD.

== Types ==
Coated fabrics can be made in a variety of ways, depending on the coating ingredients used, such as chemical and particles. Rubber, plastic, and vinyl coatings are just a few examples. Nanofabrics are coated with a wide range of nanoparticles to make the fabrics capable of enhanced properties such as ultrahydrophobicity, medical textiles (antimicrobial resistance), Ultraviolet protection, and elasticity.

Nanofabric coatings create fabrics whose fibers have better durability and wearability, and less coating material is needed compared to conventional finishes due to the ordered structure.

=== Use ===
The applications and uses of coated fabrics are numerous.

- In manufacturing of pristine clothes.
- Self cleaning fabrics with lotus effect.
- PPE kits, aprons, coverall and gowns for healthcare workers usable in viral diseases such as COVID-19, medical textiles with protecting properties, body fluid resistance and antimicrobial surface.
- Coated fabrics also contribute to fire-retardant fabrics.
- In distinctive areas, coated fabrics are used for transportation, industrial application, geotextile, and military use.

== See also ==
- Adhesive tape
- Coated paper
- Plastic-coated paper
- Plasma treatment (textiles)
