= Stain repellent =

Functional finish on fabrics in order to prevent the unwanted stains

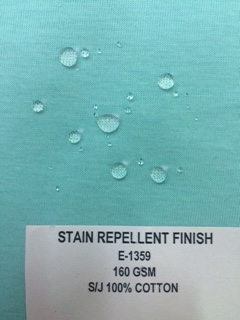
Illustration of stain repellancy

A stain repellent is a product added to fabric in order to prevent stains.

== Stains ==
Stains on fabrics are classified into three types: water-based stains and oil-based stains or a mix of both.

== Stain repellant fabrics ==
Fabrics are finished with certain finishes that do not allow unwanted stains or that will wash out in simple laundry.

== Chemicals ==
Mostly larger PFCAs such as perfluorooctanoic acid (PFOA) are used in stain repellancy. It is also known colloquially as C8. PFOA is a product of health concern and subject to regulatory action and voluntary industrial phase-outs.

=== Alternative chemistry ===
There are chemicals which are based on C8 free chemistry that may be used as an alternative to PFOA, but those are less durable.

== See also ==
- Fluorosurfactant
- Perfluorobutanesulfonic acid
- Perfluorooctanesulfonic acid
- Scotchgard
