= Automotive textile =

Textiles used in a variety of applications in the automotive industry

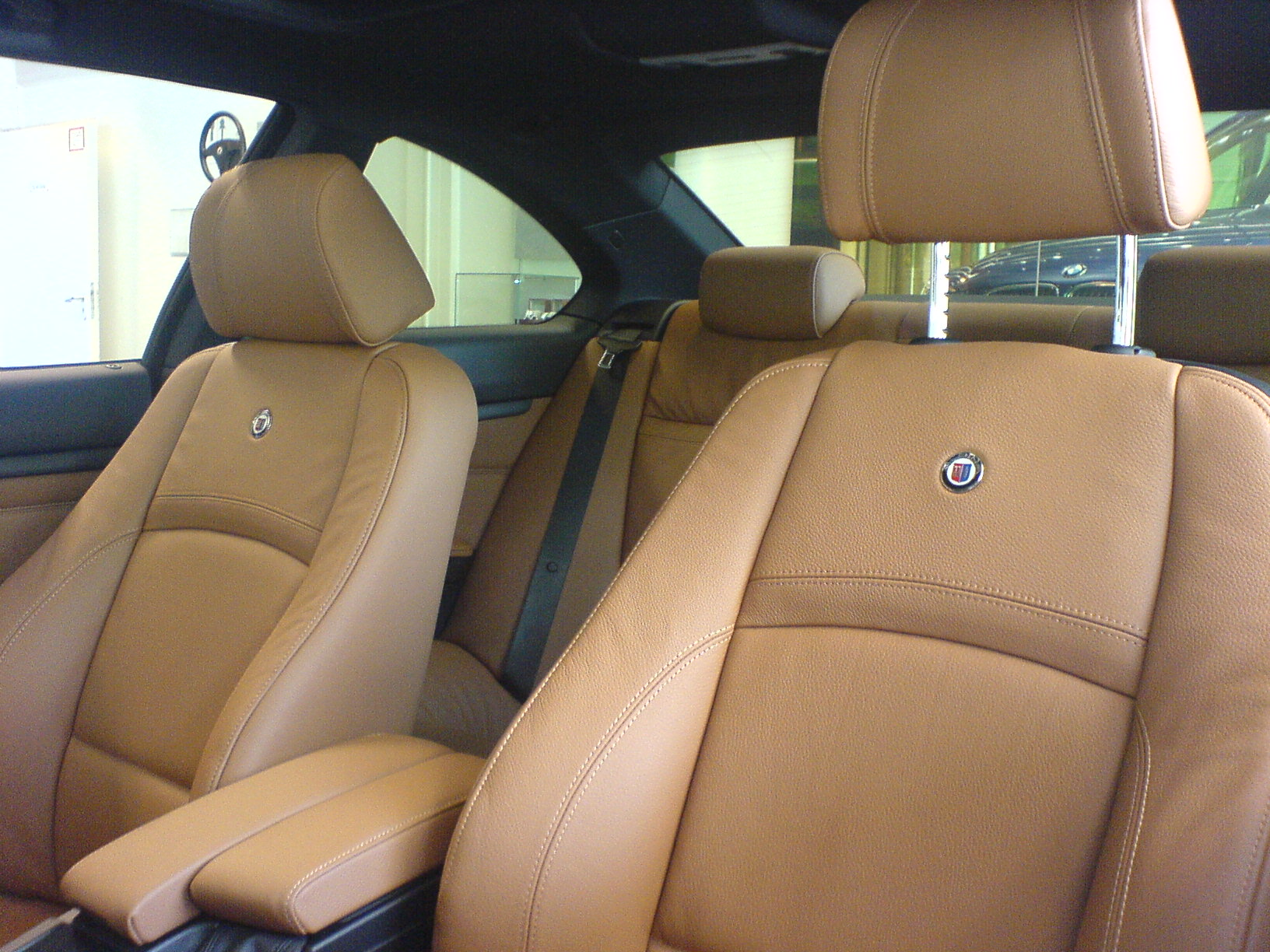
Front bucket seats in a BMW Alpina

An Automotive textile is a technical textile used in the transportation and automotive industries. The choice of type of automotive textile focuses on aspects of safety, comfort, and aesthetics. These textiles have variety of applications in the automotive industry, such as interior fittings, safety features, sound insulation, and tire reinforcement.

== Material and performance parameters ==
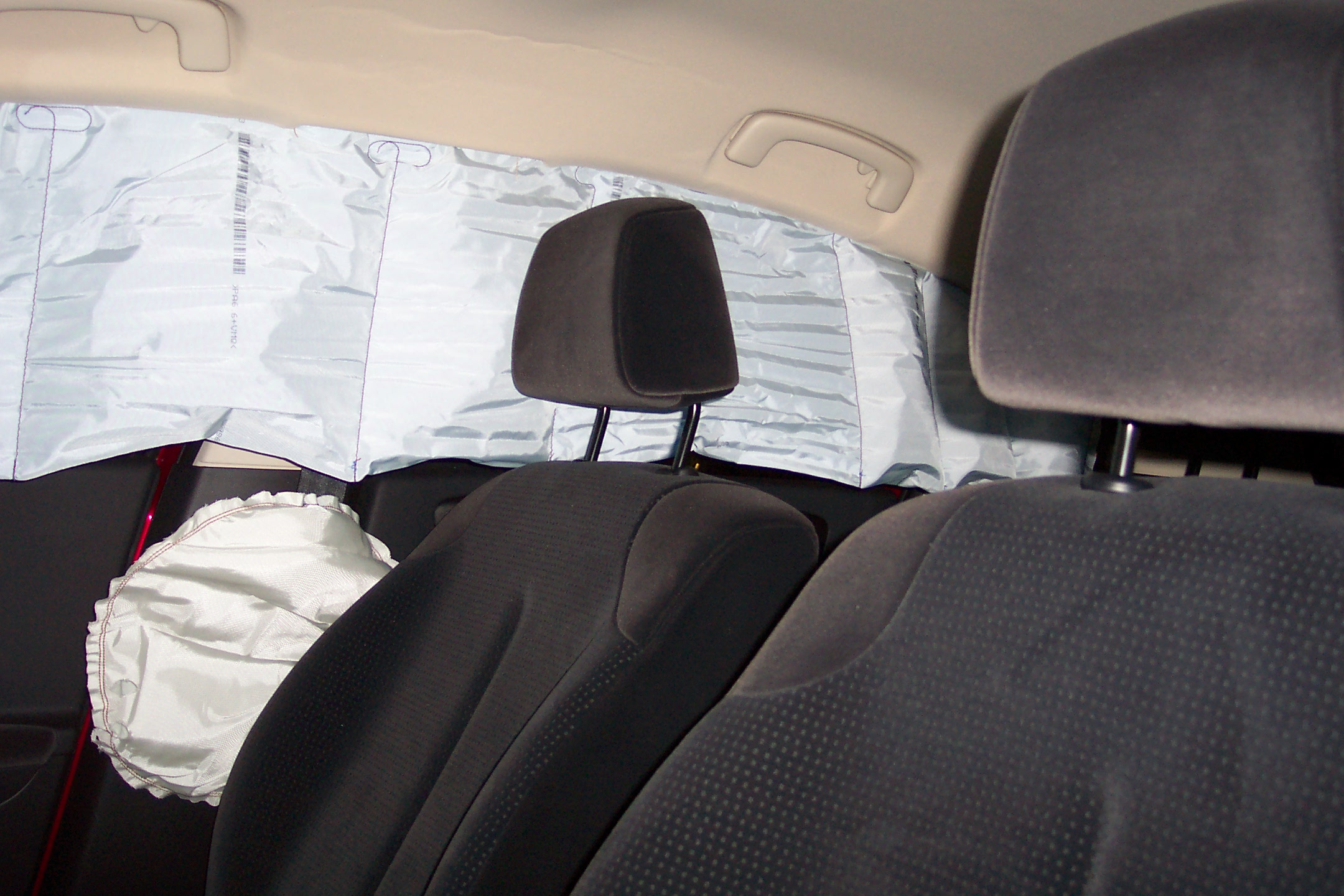
Deployed curtain airbag and side torso airbag in a Citroën C4

Certain performance parameters are required for automotive textiles. Different needs are filled by different types of fiber and structures.

High tensile materials are used for airbags. Truck covers are made with PVC or coated polyester material. Textiles are also used for trunk coverings (often needle felts) and cargo tie downs. Many coated and reinforced textiles are used in materials for engines such as air ducts, timing belts, and air filters. Non-woven textiles are used for cabin air filtration and engine sound isolation.

- Abrasion resistance
- Colorfastness to light and rubbing
- UV protection
- Tear and tensile strength and seam strength
- Flame resistance
- Anti-static
- Stretch and recovery
- Soil and stain release.

Textiles are also used in the interior of cars, the most obvious uses being for seat covers, safety belts and airbags. Automotive textiles share similarities with home textiles but with stringent quality parameters. Automotive textiles use high-performance fibers, polyester, nylon produced by knitting, warp knitting, weaving or nonwovens.

=== Synthetic fibers ===
==== Nylon ====
Nylon fibers, which are strong, tough, resilient, and elastic, are the most commonly used fiber type in automotive textiles.

==== Polyester ====
Polyester is appropriate for upholstery and seat cushions because it is a strong material with satisfactory colorfastness properties.

=== High performance fibers ===
==== Aramid ====
Hoses require strong, chemical-resistant materials such as polyester, rayon, or aramid.

==== Carbon ====
Woven fabrics and composites of carbon fiber are used in car parts.

=== Composite materials ===
Composite materials are formed by combining materials to create an overall structure with properties that differ from individual components. Composite materials are used in headliners of the vehicles.

=== Others ===
==== Leather and other alternatives ====
For seat covers, pure leather and imitated leather, and suede finished fabric is used. Ultrasuede is a type of suede material that is used in automobile and aircraft seats.

Polyurethane is used for foam.

==== Blends or hybrid materials ====
To achieve certain functional characteristics, blended (mix of two types of fibers) covering materials are also used in automotive textiles.

===== Laminated and coated materials =====
Laminated and coated materials are also used in Automotive sector. Examples are Truck covers (PVC coated PES fabrics) and seat covers made of Alcantara (material).

== Use ==
Cars, and buses have a large use of automotive textiles. A car can consume up to 25 kg of fabric, primarily used for roof coverings and upholstery. Automotive textiles also used in interior trimmings, seats, side panels, carpets, and car trunk coverings, linings, tires, filters, belts, hoses, airbags, etc.

Due to specific performance requirements, different types of fibres are chosen for various sections.

Car section/part	Fabric consumption in Square meters	Material	Properties of fibers	Performance expectations from the material used
Airbags	3.5	Nylon coated with silicone or Neoprene from inside.	Strong, elastic, tough and stable in terms of shrinkage.	Capability of holding air when inflated and should be strong enough to withstand the impact without rupturing.
Door Panels	2.0	Nylon		
Upholstery	10.0	Nylon & Polyester	Abrasion resistance	Strong abrasion resistance to withstand the friction when sliding of objects and the passengers. To retain the shape and smoothness of the seats. Colors should be fast to the sunlight and rubbing to sustain the exposure.
Headliner	4.0-6.0	Composite materials	Insulating	Aesthetics, softness, insulation
Seat belts	0.5	Polyester		
Trunk	4.0-5.0	Nylon	Strong, tough and abrasion resistant	Strong enough to stand friction, antimicrobial
Parcel shelf	1.0			
Pillars	2.0	Nylon		
Carpet	4.0	Nylon	Strong, tough and abrasion resistant	Strong enough to stand with the friction, the material must be tough and resilient.
Total	31.0-34.0			

== See also ==
- Automotive safety
