= Clothing physiology =

Study of clothing's interaction with the human body

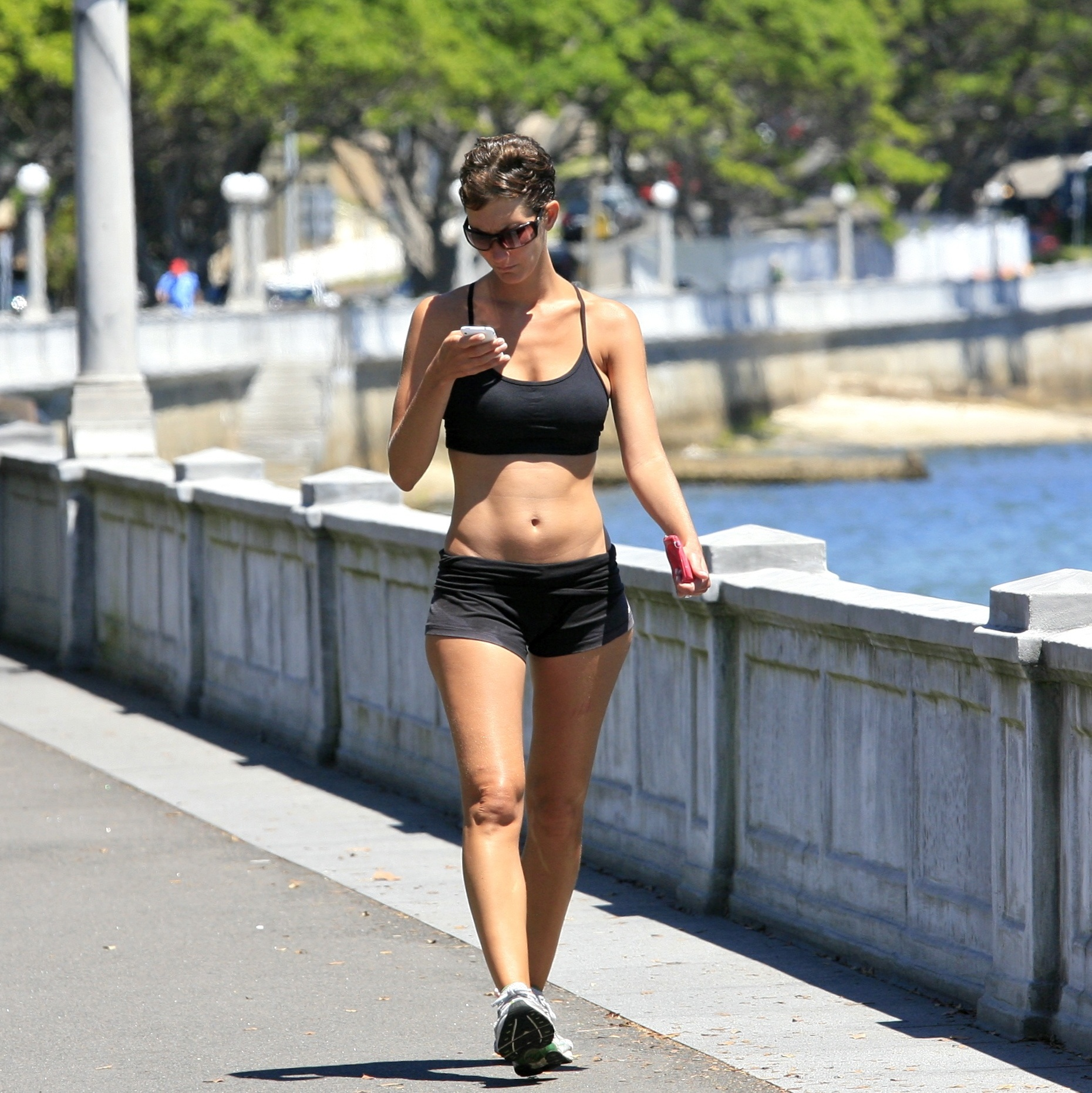
A woman wearing sports bra and boyshorts, conventionally women's sportswear, but now worn as casuals or athleisure by women in the West

Clothing physiology is a branch of science that studies the interaction between clothing and the human body, with a particular focus on how clothing affects the physiological and psychological responses of individuals to different environmental conditions. The goal of clothing physiology research is to develop a better understanding of how clothing can be designed to optimize comfort, performance, and protection for individuals in various settings, including outdoor recreation, occupational environments, and medical contexts.

== Purpose of clothing ==
Human clothing motives are frequently oversimplified in cultural and sociological theories, with the assumption that they are solely motivated by modesty, adornment, protection, or sex. However, clothing is primarily motivated by the environment, with its form being influenced by human characteristics and traits, as well as physical and social factors such as sex relations, costume, caste, class, and religion. Ultimately, clothing must be comfortable in various environmental conditions to support physiological behavior. The concept of clothing has been aptly characterized as a quasi-physiological system that interacts with the human body.

=== Quasi-physiological systems ===
Clothing can be considered as a quasi-physiological system that interacts with the body in different ways, just like the distinct physiological systems of the human body, such as digestive system and nervous system, which can be analyzed systematically.

== Purpose of clothing physiology ==
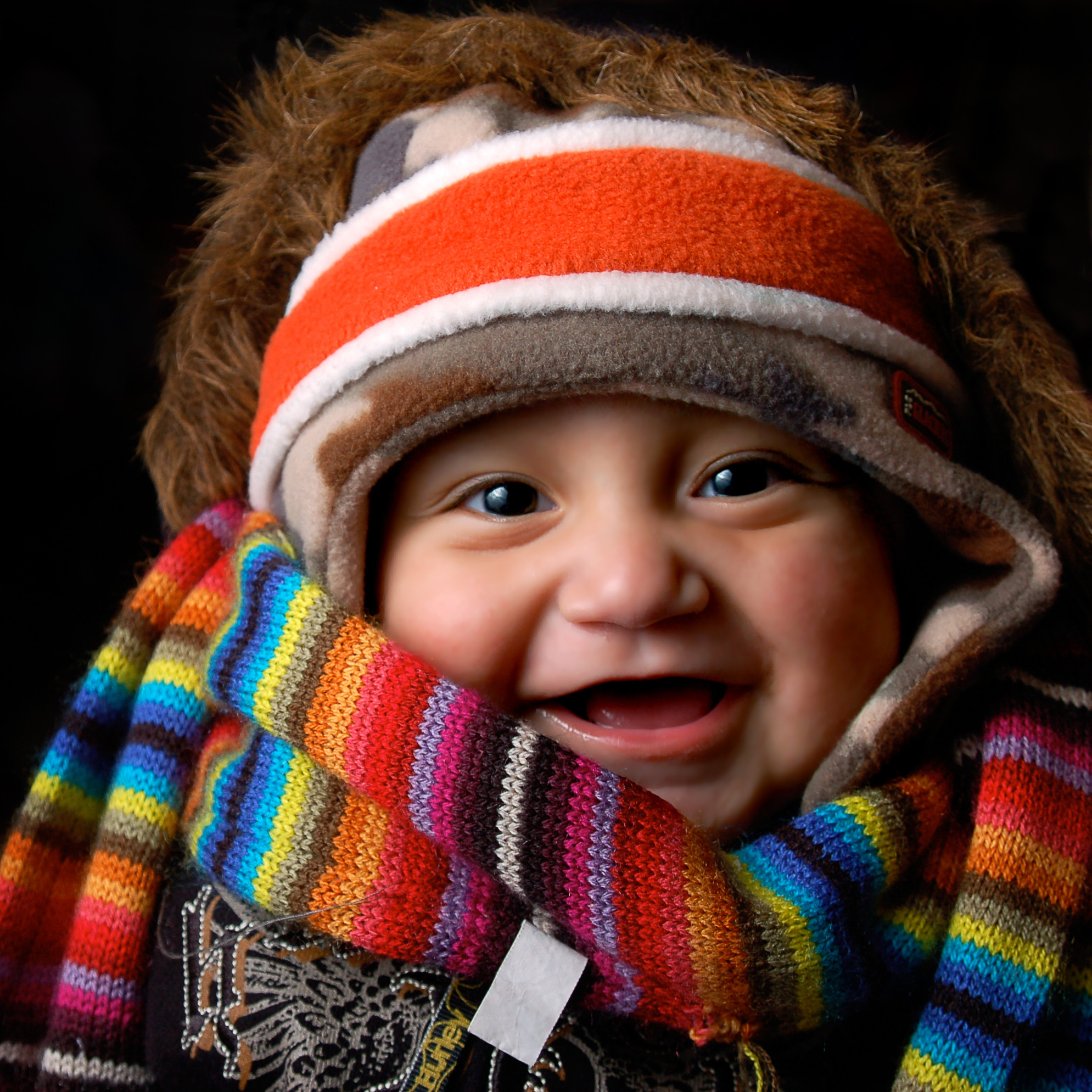
A baby wearing many items of winter clothing: headband, cap, fur-lined coat, scarf, and sweater

The acceptance and perceived comfort of a garment cannot be attributed solely to its thermal properties. Rather, the sensation of comfort when wearing a garment is associated with various factors, including the fit of the garment, its moisture buffering properties, and the mechanical characteristics of the fibers and fabrics used in its construction.

The field of clothing physiology concerns the complex interplay between the human body, environmental conditions, and clothing. Through the use of scientific methods, it is possible to accurately measure and quantify the effects of clothing on wearer comfort and overall well-being.

Louis Newburgh is widely recognized among thermal physiologists primarily due to his role as the editor of "Physiology of Heat Regulation and the Science of Clothing". From a physiological perspective, the purpose of clothing is to shield the body from extreme temperatures, whether they be hot or cold. The role of clothing in affecting the wearer's comfort can be described as the connection between the body and the surroundings. When engaged in outdoor activities, the individual's comfort level is influenced by various environmental factors, such as air temperature, humidity, solar radiation, atmospheric and ground thermal radiation. The wearer's posture, metabolic rate, sweating rate, and bodily processes such as moisture absorption, sweat evaporation, and heat loss through conduction and convection via blood, are among additional factors that also play a role in determining the individual's comfort level.

=== Skin physiology ===
The contact between clothing and skin facilitates the regulation of body temperature through the control of blood flow and sweat evaporation in localized areas. However, the design of functional fabrics that efficiently regulate skin temperature must take into account crucial factors such as age, gender, and activity level. The skin plays a vital role in safeguarding the body's homeostasis by performing a variety of crucial protective functions. Clothing and other textiles interact dynamically with the skin's functions, and the mechanical properties of the fabric, such as its surface roughness, can lead to non-specific skin reactions, such as wool intolerance or keratosis follicularis.

==== Thermal comfort and insulation ====
It's common to express metabolic activity in terms of heat production. A resting adult typically generates 100 W of heat, with a significant amount dissipating through the skin. Heat production per unit area of skin, referred to as 1 met, is around 58 W/m2 for a resting individual, based on the average male European's skin surface area of approximately 1.8 m2. The average female European's skin surface area is 1.6 m2 for comparison.

Skin temperatures that correspond to comfort during stationary activities range from 91.4 to 93.2 °F (33.0 to 34.0 °C), and these temperatures decrease as the level of physical activity increases. Skin temperature that exceeds 45 °C or falls below 18 °C induces a sensation of pain. Internal temperatures increase with activity. The brain's temperature regulatory center is around 36.8 °C when at rest and rises to about 37.4 °C when walking and 37.9 °C when jogging. A temperature below 28 °C can cause fatal cardiac arrhythmia, while a temperature above 43 °C can result in permanent brain damage. Thus, it's crucial to regulate body temperature carefully for both comfort and health.

Clothing insulation can be denoted using the unit of measurement called clo. In the absence of clothing, a thin layer of static air known as the boundary layer forms in close proximity to the skin, acting as an insulating layer that restricts heat exchange between the skin and the surrounding environment. This layer typically offers approximately 0.8 clo units of insulation in a motionless state. It's difficult to apply this generalization to very thin fabric layers or underwear, as they occupy an existing static air layer of no more than 0.5 cm thickness. Consequently, these thin layers offer minimal contribution to the clothing's intrinsic insulation.

The standard measure for clothing insulation is 1.57 clo·cm-1 in thickness, which is equivalent to 4 clo·inch-1.

== Applications ==
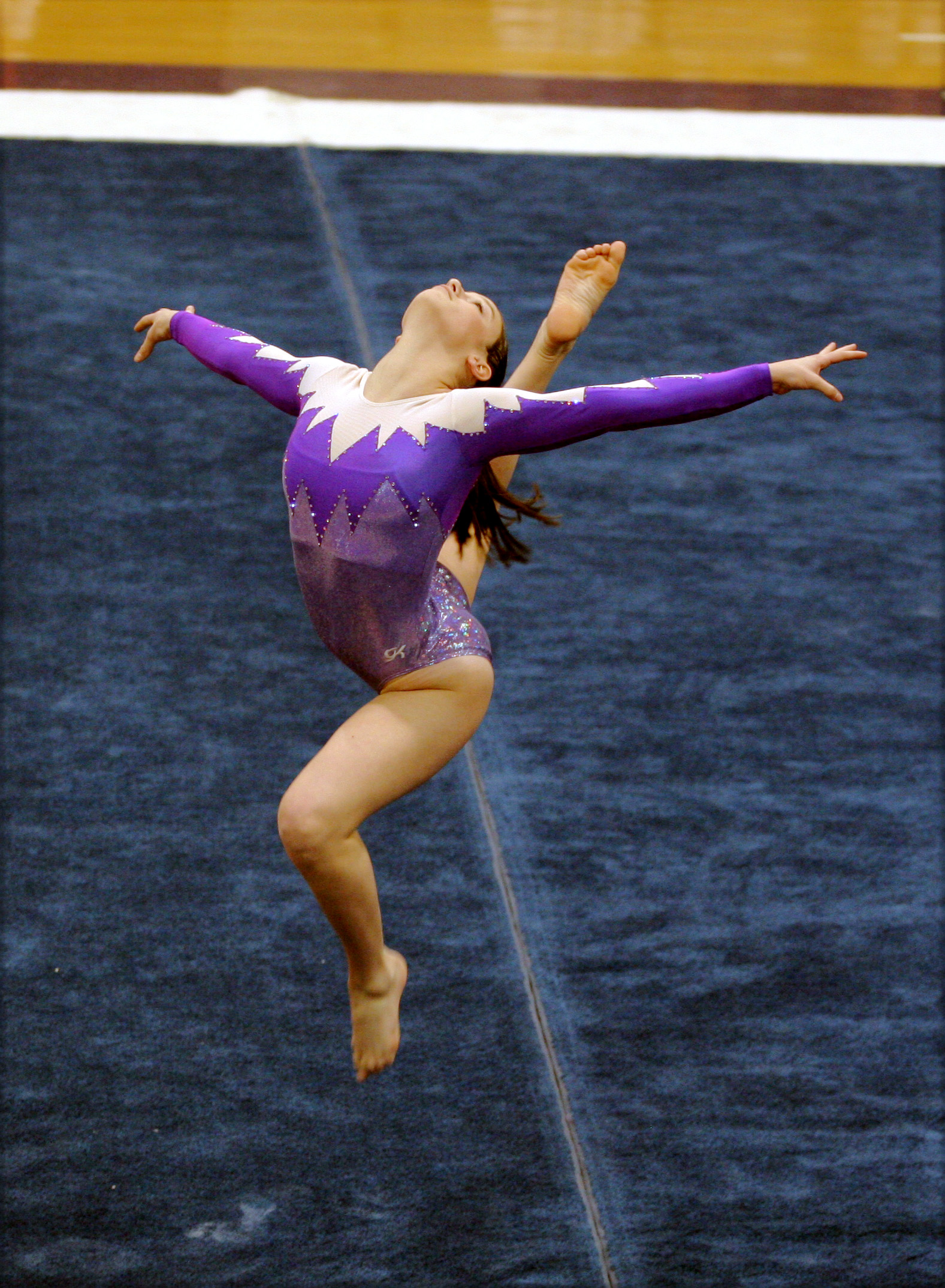
Enhanced moveability with Elastane

The advancements in fibers, textiles, electronics, functional finishing, and clothing physiology are anticipated to improve human life in numerous areas such as medicine, military, firefighting, extreme sports, and other apparel applications. The study of clothing physiology has been prompted by the need to design effective clothing systems for various specialized environments such as space, polar regions, underwater operations, and industrial settings.

=== Clothing comfort ===
Comfort is a multifaceted concept that encompasses various perceptions, including physiological, social, and psychological needs. After sustenance, clothing is one of the most vital objects that can satisfy comfort requirements. This is because clothing offers a range of benefits, including aesthetic, tactile, thermal, moisture, and pressure comfort.

=== Protection ===
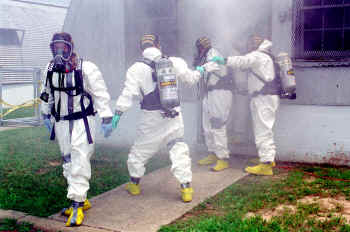
Drug Enforcement Administration (DEA) agents wearing Level B hazmat suits

The clothing physiology comfort of an athlete is significantly influenced by the compression effect exerted by their garments. The degree of compression load exerted by the clothing has a direct correlation with the intensity of sweating and the resulting elevation in skin temperature. Specifically, a greater compression load on the body results in a higher degree of sweating and increased skin temperature.

== Testing ==
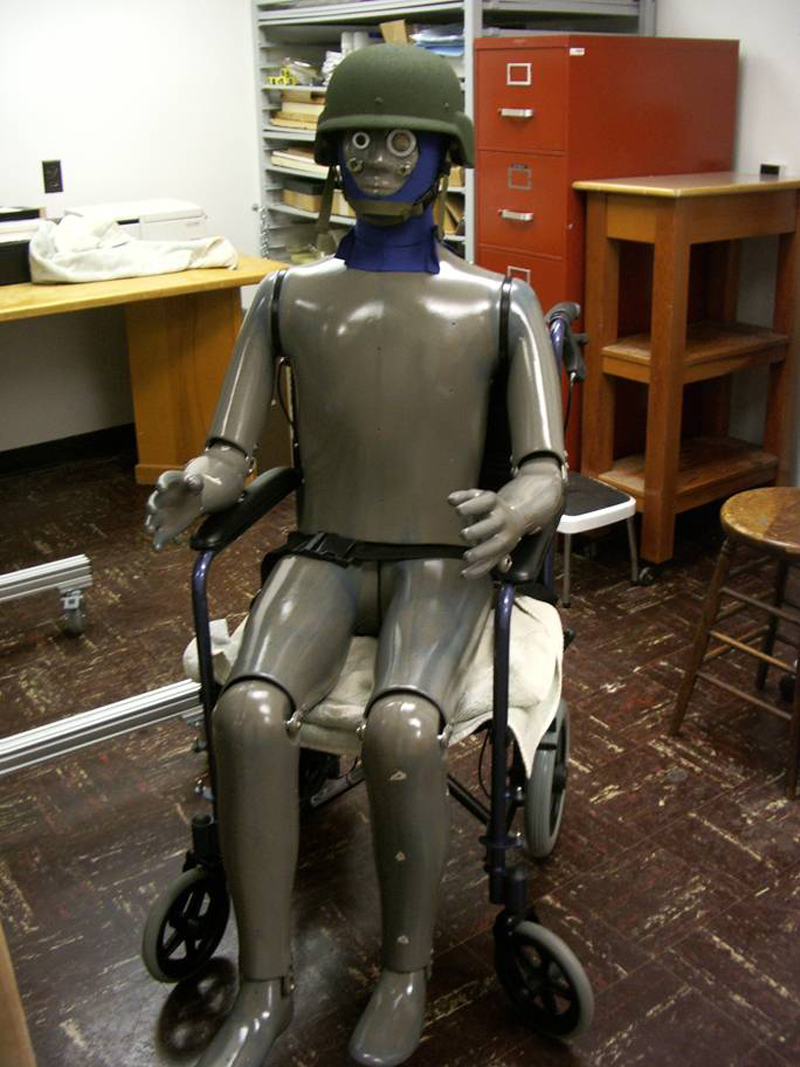
A thermal manikin being used to test helmet padding

Thermophysiological models have become a prevalent tool for forecasting human physiological reactions in varying environmental and clothing conditions.

Clothing physiology can be assessed through the utilization of various advanced instruments, including: Sherlock is a thermal manikin test device developed by the Hohenstein Institutes to evaluate clothing physiology, and it is equipped with perspiration simulation capabilities.

=== SpaceTex experiment ===
In the SpaceTex experiment, novel fabrics were evaluated for their ability to enhance heat transfer and manage sweat during physical activity, based on their antibacterial properties. Quick-drying T-shirts made from such fabrics would be advantageous to athletes, firefighters, miners, and military personnel. This marks the first experiment in clothing physiology conducted in microgravity, with sportswear manufacturers aiming to improve their products accordingly. In fact, a modified polyester has already been developed for use by the Swiss military.

== Certain precautions ==
The integumentary system is a significant immune organ, possessing both specific and non-specific activities related to immunity. Antimicrobial fabrics could potentially disrupt the skin's non-specific defense mechanisms such as antimicrobial peptides or the resident microflora.

== Social psychology of clothing ==
The social psychology of dress entails comprehending the interconnections that exist between attire and human conduct.

== See also ==
- Technical textile
- Textile performance
- Personal protective equipment
- Uniforms of the Canadian Armed Forces
