= Plasma treatment (textiles) =

Surface modification process for textiles

Plasma treatment is a surface modification process for textiles that imparts various functional properties at a lower cost, with fewer chemical adverse effects, and with a reduced environmental impact all while maintaining important textile properties.

== Plasma ==
After solid, liquid, and gas, plasma is referred to as the fourth state of matter. Non-thermal and cold plasma are used to modify the surfaces of textiles. Interactions with cold plasma have little effect on the bulk characteristics of textiles. When a cold plasma interacts with a material contained within it (substrate), a variety of events occur, individually or in combination. Four major types of effects are: Cross-linking, etching, functionalization, and the formation of a deposit on the substrate's surface.

== Advantages ==
Plasma treatment in textiles can produce various functional properties, such as antimicrobial textiles, and water repellent textiles. In comparison to conventional finishing procedures, plasmas have the significant advantage of lower chemical, water, and energy use. Plasma treatment is environmentally friendly because it is comparable to a dry process.

== See also ==
- Textile performance
