= Headliner (material) =

Adhered to the inside roof of automobiles or yachts

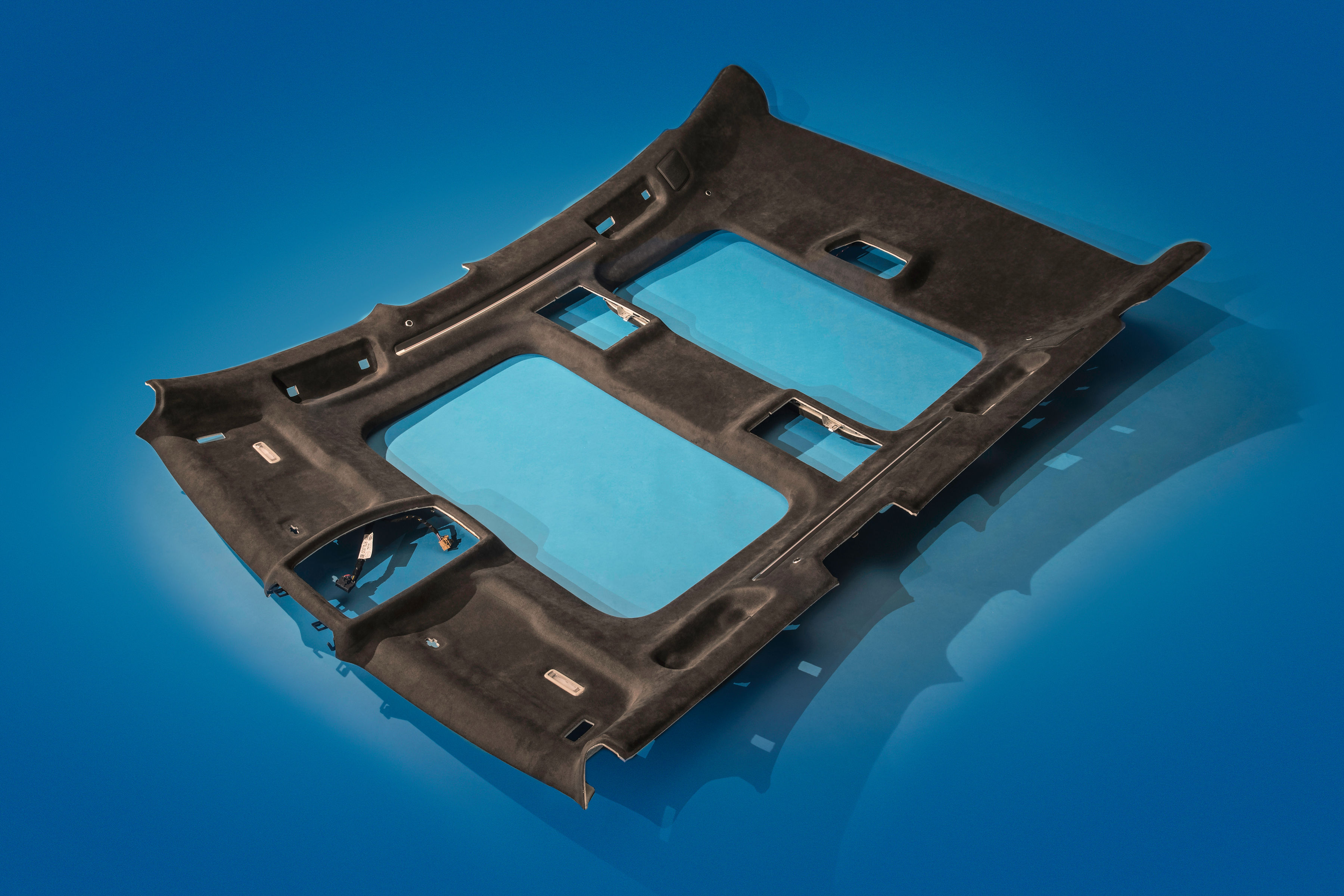
Headliner from an automobile

A headliner often is a composite material that is adhered to the inside roof of automobiles, aircraft, and yachts. It typically consists of a face fabric with a nonwoven or foam backing. Headliners consist of multilayered composite materials that bring together multiple functionalities, including the requested look, feel, stiffness, and sound reduction needed in cars. Automotive headliners are optimised with respect to head impact counter measures or to integrate additional LED lighting film behind the fabric. Most headliners consist of a tricot knit fabric that is napped to provide a soft touch and uniform appearance. The fabric is adhered to melted polyurethane foam. This fabric-foam composite is glued to the interior fiberglass roof of the automobile.

There are more complex knit products used as a face fabric, as well as less expensive non-woven products. Recent headliner developments include environmentally friendly products made of recyclable backing-adhesive and face fabrics.

In yachts, foam-backed vinyl is often used.

== Replacements ==
When a headliner fails, it sags or falls from the roof. One can use upholstery twist pins (a flat-headed corkscrew-like pin) to effect a temporary repair, but repairs usually involve tacking or replacing the entire headliner. Heat, humidity, and time rapidly degrade the bond that the polyurethane foam has with the face fabric. As the foam oxidizes and yellows, the fabric-foam bond fails. This failure is more common in cars produced in the 1970s.

Replacing the entire headliner fabric is usually necessary as the oxidized foam can prove nearly impossible to remove from the sagging fabric.
