= Technical textile =

Textile product valued for its functional characteristics

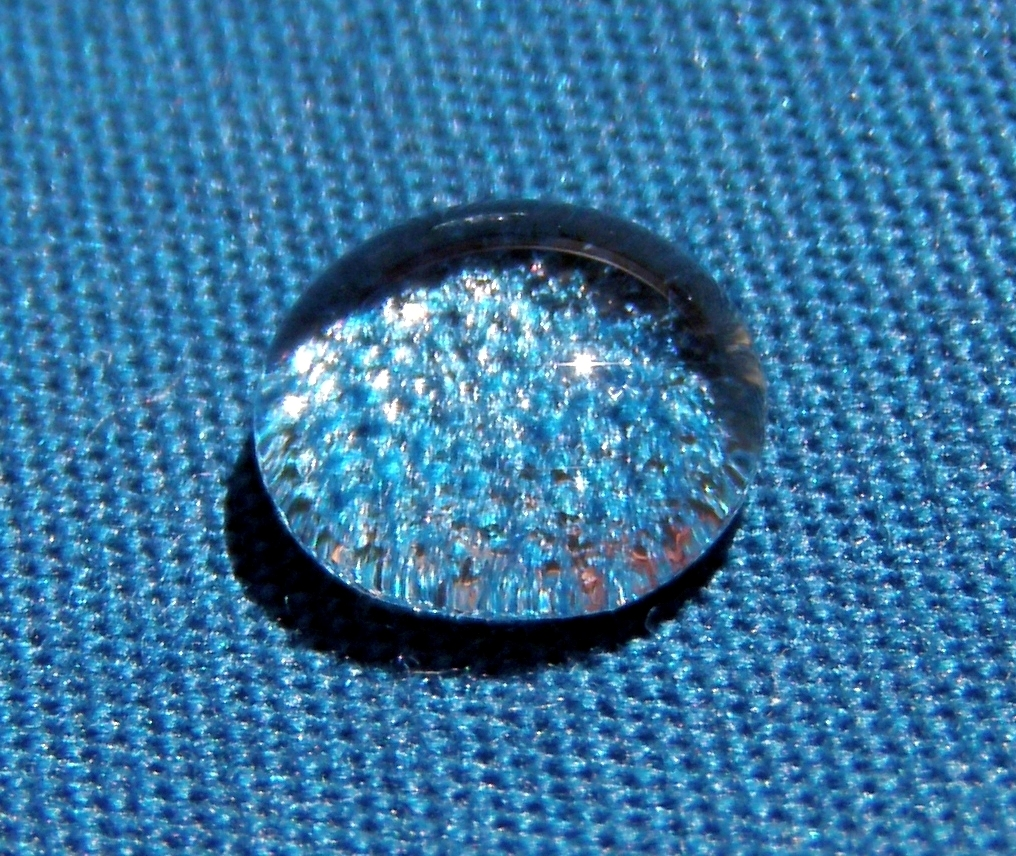
Water droplet on the surface of fabric coated with durable water repellent

Technical textiles are a category of textiles specifically engineered and manufactured to serve functional purposes beyond traditional apparel and home furnishing applications. These textiles are designed with specific performance characteristics and properties, making them suitable for various industrial, medical, automotive, aerospace, and other technical applications. Unlike conventional textiles used for clothing or decoration, technical textiles are optimized to offer qualities such as strength, durability, flame resistance, chemical resistance, moisture management, and other specialized functionalities to meet the specific needs of diverse industries and sectors.

== Overview ==
A technical textile is a textile product usually manufactured for non-aesthetic purposes, where function is the primary criterion. Technical textiles include textiles for automotive applications, medical textiles (e.g., implants), geotextiles (reinforcement of embankments), agrotextiles (textiles for crop protection), and protective clothing (e.g., heat and radiation protection for fire fighter clothing, molten metal protection for welders, stab protection and bulletproof vests, and spacesuits).

The sector is large, growing, and supports a vast array of other industries. The global growth rate of technical textiles is about 4% per year. Currently, technical textile materials are most widely used in filter clothing, furniture, hygiene medicals and construction material.

== Classification ==
Technical textiles can be divided into many categories, depending on their end use. The classification system developed by Techtextil, Messe Frankfurt Exhibition GmbH, is widely used in Europe, North America, and Asia. Techtextil specifies 12 application areas: Agrotech, Buildtech, Clothtech, Geotech, Hometech, Indutech, Medtech, Mobiltech, Oekotech, Packtech, Protech, and Sporttech, Architech (Architectural textile), Military textiles, Autotech (Automobile textiles), Smartech (Smart Textiles), Wearable computers. These are sometimes spelled Agrotex, Buildtex, Clothtex, Geotex, Hometex, Indutex, Medtex, Mobiltex, Oekotex (Ecotex), Packtex, Protex and Sportex.

=== Agrotech (agro-textiles) ===
Agro-textiles applied for the agrotech sector, with approach crop protection and crop development and reducing the risks of farming practices. Primarily agro-textiles offer weather resistance and resistance to microorganisms and protection from unwanted elements and external factors. Agro-textiles helps to improve the overall conditions with which crop can develop and be protected. There are the various textile products, fabrics forms, fibers and techniques used in agro-textiles which are useful for agriculture mainly for crop protection and in crop development such as shade nets, thermal insulation and sunscreen materials, windshield, antibird nets, which provide minimal shading and proper temperature, air circulation for protecting plants from direct sunlight and birds. Other agrotextiles include mulch mats, hail protection nets, and crop covers. Agro-textiles are useful in Horticulture, aquaculture, landscape gardening and forestry also. More examples of use and application are covering livestock protection, suppressing weeds, and insect control.

=== Buildtech (construction textiles) ===
Construction textiles are used in: construction concrete reinforcement, façade foundation systems, interior construction, insulations, proofing materials, air conditioning, noise prevention, visual protection, protection against the sun, and building safety.

Another application is the use of textile membranes for roof construction. This area is also referred to as textile architecture. PVC-coated high-tensile polyester (PES), teflon-coated glass fibre fabrics, or silicone-coated PES are used for their low creep properties. Examples of such construction are found in football stadiums, airports, and hotels.

=== Clothtech (clothing textiles) ===
Technical textiles for clothing applications. It is a segment of technical textiles comprises all textile components used primarily in clothing and footwear. Clothtech encompasses the functional parts that may not be visible, such as zippers, labels, sewing threads, elastics, insulating fiber fills, waddings, shoelaces, and drawcords velcro, and interlining cloths. Sewing threads is the major component that accounts around 60% followed by labels at 19%, interlinings at 8%, shoelaces and zip fasteners at 5%, and Velcro and umbrellas at 2%.

Clothtech is a significant division of the technical textile sector, contributing 7% to the overall technical textile industry.

=== Geotech (geotextiles) ===
Geotextiles are used in reinforcement of embankments or in construction work. The fabrics in geo textiles are permeable fabrics and are used with the soils having ability to separate, filter, protect or drain. The application areas include civil engineering, earth and road construction, dam engineering, soil sealing and in drainage systems. The fabric used must have good strength, durability, low moisture absorption and thickness. Mostly nonwoven and woven fabrics are used in it. Synthetic fibers like glass, polypropylene and acrylic fibers are used to prevent cracking of the concrete, plastic and other building materials. Polypropylene and polyester are used in geo textiles and dry/liquid filtration due to their compatibility.

=== Hometech (domestic textiles) ===
Textiles used in a domestic environment - interior decoration and furniture, carpeting, protection against the sun, cushion materials, fireproofing, pillows, floor and wall coverings, textile reinforced structures/fittings.

In the contract market such as for large area buildings, ships, caravans, busses, fire retardant materials are used. Fire-retardant properties are obtained either through the use of inherent fire retardant fibres such as modacrylic or through the application of a coating with fire retardant additives (bromide of phosphorus compounds).

=== Indutech (industrial textiles) ===
Textiles used for chemical and electrical applications and textiles related to mechanical engineering. Silk-screen printing, filtration, plasma screens, propulsion technology, lifting/conveying equipment, sound-proofing elements, melting processes, roller covers, grinding technology, insulations, seals, fuel cell.

==== Lifting textiles ====
Technical textiles for lifting applications. Used in process of lifting heavy goods. The textile produced is strongly woven with High tenacity yarns and the fabric is treated with heat and high temperature controlling its elongations. This is usually made of High tenacity polyester and Nylon however HMPE yarns as Dyneema are also used.

=== Medtech (medical textiles) ===
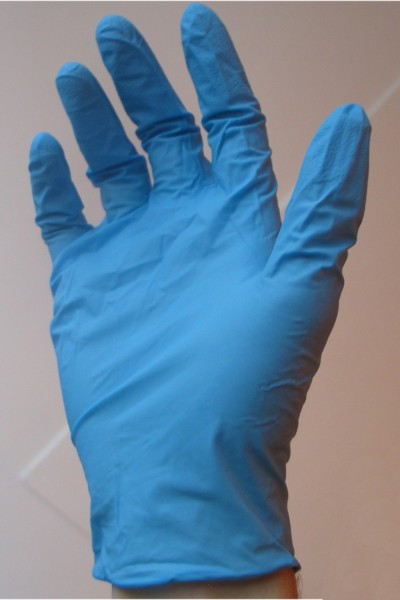
A disposable glove made of nitrile rubber. These gloves are often used during medical examinations and procedures to reduce the risk of cross-contamination and germ dissemination.

Medical textiles are the textile materials such as fibers, yarns and fabrics that support medtech (area of application) with healthcare, hygiene, infection control, barrier materials, polymeric Implants, medical devices and smart technologies. The medical textiles help with a variety of products in handling medical practices and procedures such as treating an injury and dealing with a medical environment or situation. Medical textiles also include fibers for growing human organic tissues.

Medical textiles offer laminated and coated materials for various gowns for better protection from infections, fluids such as PPE gowns for doctors, nurses, hospital staff and gowns worn by healthcare personnel as personal protective equipment, patient gowns and surgical and isolation gowns. The technical textiles for medical use also help in providing facemasks, FFP2 facial mask, surgical clothing and drapes, disposable nitrile gloves, goggles or visors, head caps, long shoe covers hoods, various wound care assistance such as bandages and dressings, and compression garments, etc. Medical textiles integrated with smart technologies provide remote contact between doctor and a user.

In the United States, medical gowns are medical devices regulated by the FDA. Surgical isolation gowns are regulated by the FDA as a Class II medical device that require a 510(k) premarket notification, but non-surgical gowns are Class I devices exempt from premarket review. Surgical gowns only require protection of the front of the body due to the controlled nature of surgical procedures, while surgical isolation gowns and non-surgical gowns require protection over nearly the entire gown. During the Ebola crisis of 2014, the WHO published a rapid advice guideline on PPE coveralls.

=== Mobiltech (textiles used in transport; automotive and aerospace) ===
Mobiltech textiles are used in the engineering and design of automobiles, railways, ships, aircraft and spacecraft. Examples are Truck covers (PVC coated PES fabrics), car trunk coverings (often needle felts), lashing belts for cargo tie downs, seat covers (knitted materials), perforated leather steering wheels (breathable leather), seat belts, nonwovens for cabin air filtration (also covered in indutech), airbags, parachutes, boats (inflatable), air balloons.

Many coated and reinforced textiles are used in materials for engines such as air ducts, timing belts, air filters, non-wovens for engine sound isolation. A number of materials are also used in the interior of cars. The most obvious are seat covers, safety belts and airbags but one can find textiles also for the sealing. Nylon gives strength and its bursting strength being high is used as air bags in cars.

Carbon composites are mostly used in the manufacture of aeroplane parts while carbon fibre is used for making higher end tyres. High tensile polyester is used for making air balloons.

=== Oekotech or ecotech (ecological protection textile) ===
New applications for textiles in environmental protection applications - floor sealing, erosion protection, air cleaning, prevention of water pollution, water cleaning, waste treatment/recycling, depositing area construction, product extraction, domestic water sewerage plants.

=== Packtech (packaging textiles) ===
Packaging textiles are the materials such as fibers, yarns, fabrics, and polymers contribute to manufacture various packaging, silos, containers, bags, lashing straps, canvas covers, marquee tents.

=== Protech (protective textiles) ===
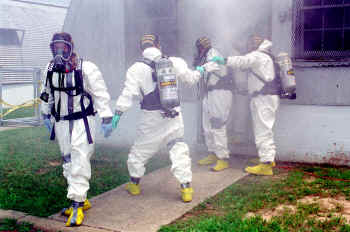
DEA agents wearing Level B hazmat suits (also called hazardous materials suit). The suit is a piece of PPE that consists of an impermeable whole-body garment worn as protection against hazardous materials.

The main target of the technical protective fabrics is to improve people safety in their workplaces. A technical protective fabric can save a worker's life, that's why, most of them are mainly used to manufacture PPE (personal protective equipment). The demand of these fabrics is growing around the world thank to the sensibilitization of the society, requiring more safety at work. There are some organizations around the world (ASTM and ISO) which describe the requirements and regulations, to fulfill by a fabric, to be considered as a technical protective fabric. The aim of a technical protective fabric isn't fashion, they are designed to have extra values in protection, against some hazards.

Nowadays it can be found in the market, technical fabrics which protect of:

- High temperatures (insulating, firefighters)
- burns (flame, convective and radiant heat, firefighters, ATEX area)
- Electric arc flash discharge (plasma explosion, Electric companies)
- molten metal impacts (foundries)
- metal sparks (welding)
- acid environment (petrochemical, gas, refineries, chemical)
- bullet impact (military, security)
- cut resistant (gloves, glass industry)
- astronaut's suits
- Left over food packets
- Paid banks

These fabrics are made of different kind of fibers, because every blend apports different technical characteristics to the fabric:

- Meta-Para aramides – Nomex: high resistance, tear, tensile strength, expensive,
- Wool viscoses polyamide – marlan : repellency of molten metal, heat insulation, transparency.
- Glass fiber - High resistance, insulating.
- Modacrylic cotton – Marko wiki: Marko : electric arc flash protection, comfort, flame-resistant, multinorm, efficient, skin friendly, antistatic.
- Polyamide – Kevlar : extreme resistance, low aging

=== Sportech (sports textiles) ===
Shoes, sports equipment, flying and sailing sports, climbing, angling, cycling, winter and summer sports, indoor sport it can vary from anything including sports bags.

==== Performance ====
In the context of apparel, "performance" refers to its capacity to enable unhindered movement and effortless maintenance, ensure comfort in all circumstances, and potentially enhance performance during aerobic and sporting activities, all while retaining the appearance.

== Some other areas of application ==
=== Conveyor belts ===
For industrial applications and in power transmission, technical textiles are used in conveyor belts. The reinforcement usually found on the inside of the conveyor belt is normally referred to as the ''carcass'' that is a fabric inside the conveyor belt, which is responsible for the strength and stretch properties of the belt. This carcass is made with layers of woven fabrics bonded together.

=== Electronics in textiles ===
Textiles merged with electronics enables technology for a variety of applications in health care, rehabilitation or sports. Wearable computers have larger roles and contextual capabilities such as sensing, adaptation, resource discovery, and augmentation.

== See also ==
- Advanced Functional Fabrics of America
- Biotextile
- Landscape fabric
- Marlan
- Marko
- Nonwoven fabric
- Spunlacing
- Antimicrobial textile finishes
