= Tyvek =

Brand of synthetic polyethylene fiber

- Product type: Flashspun nonwoven HDPE fiber
- Current owner: DuPont
- Country: United States
- Introduced: April 1967; 59 years ago
- Related brands: YUPO synthetic paper
- Markets: Construction, Packaging and labeling
- Tagline: What do you need to protect?
- Website: dupont.com/Tyvek

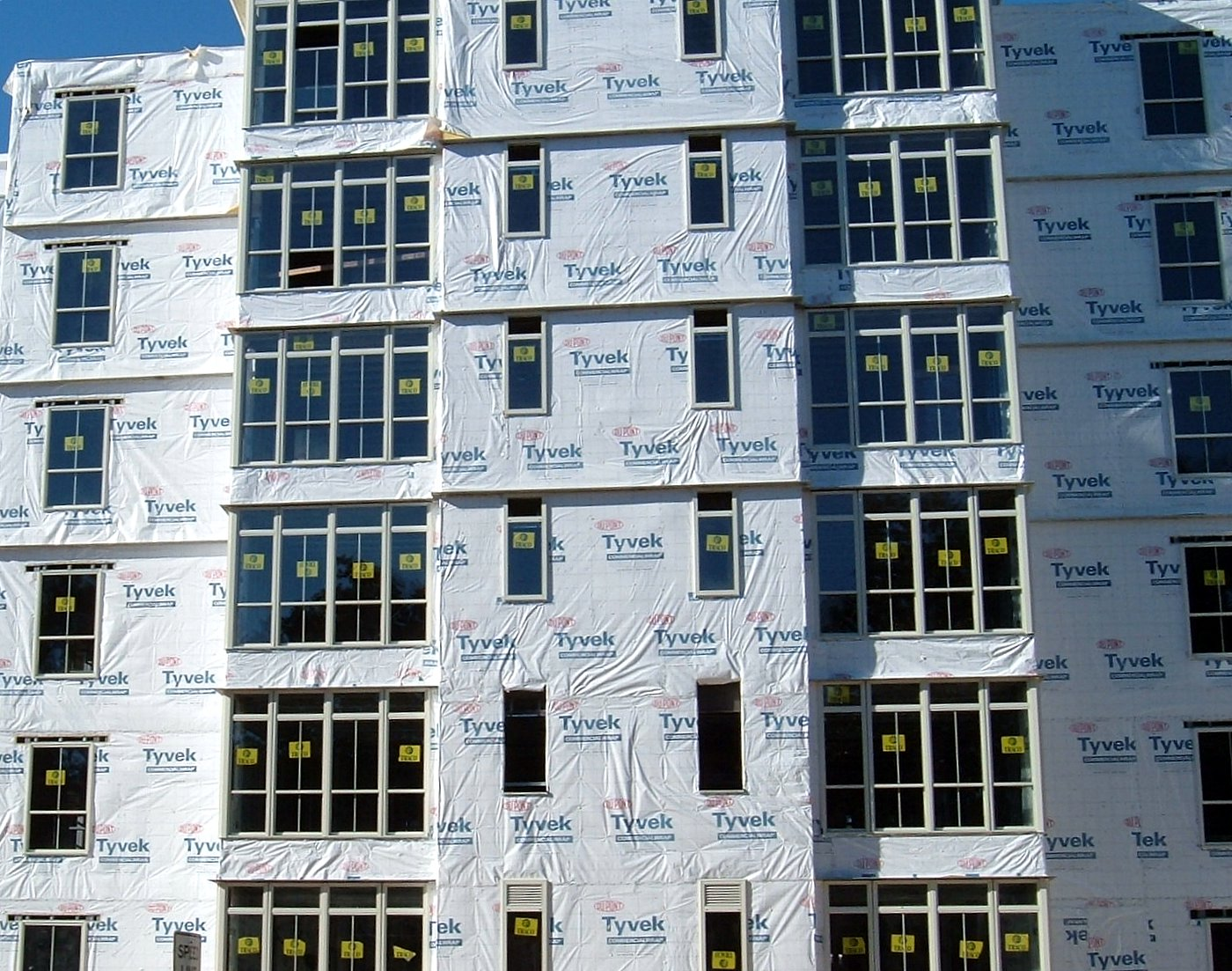
Tyvek house wrap

Tyvek (/ˈtaɪ.vɛk/) is a brand of synthetic flashspun high-density polyethylene fibers. The name Tyvek is a registered trademark of the American multinational chemical company DuPont, which discovered and commercialized Tyvek in the late 1950s and early 1960s.

Tyvek's properties—such as being difficult to tear but easily cut, and waterproof against liquids while allowing water vapor to penetrate—have led to it being used in a variety of applications. Tyvek is often used as housewrap, a synthetic material used to protect buildings during construction, or as personal protective equipment (PPE).

== History ==
Tyvek is a nonwoven product consisting of spun bond olefin fiber. It was first discovered in 1955 by a researcher for the DuPont textile company working in an experimental lab, who noticed a type of white fluff coming out of a pipe. That fluff was a form of polyethylene, which DuPont requested a patent for within a year of the discovery. After technologies improved during the next few years, in 1959 DuPont discovered that when the fluff was spun at high speeds it produced a durable fabric that could be cut with a blade. While the product Tyvek was used since 1959, DuPont did not trademark the actual brand until 1965, making it available for commercial purposes in April 1967. By 1970, Tyvek had reached the mainstream construction industry on both a national and global scale. Its products were often used for the construction of houses due to its ability to keep out liquid, while allowing vapor through. In 1972, DuPont released Tyvek packaging for sterile instruments that were to be used by surgeons and doctors in the medical field.

=== 21st century ===
DuPont currently manufactures Tyvek at the Spruance plant in Richmond, Virginia, and in Sandweiler-Contern, Luxembourg. In 2018, the company announced plans to expand the Tyvek production capacity of the Sandweiler-Contern factory.

== Scientific characteristics and properties ==
Tyvek USPS Express Mail envelope

=== Adhesion and bonding ===
To bond Tyvek to both itself and a variety of substrates, DuPont recommends starch, dextrin, casein, and animal-based adhesives over most synthetic-based adhesives, emphasizing the effectiveness of water-based and quick-drying glues. DuPont also claims that the following adhesives are highly effective:

- Ethylene/vinyl acetate
- Acrylic pressure-sensitive tape
- Solvent-based single-component polyurethane
- Hot glue

Heat sealing can be used to melt Tyvek and cause it to bond to itself, but this form of bonding tends to create puckers in the otherwise flat material. Dielectric bonding can be effective in some circumstances, as is ultrasonic welding.

=== Recycling ===
Though Tyvek superficially resembles paper (for example, it can be written and printed on), it is plastic, and it cannot be recycled with paper. Some Tyvek products are marked with the #2 resin-code for HDPE, and can be collected with plastic bottles as part of some municipal curbside recycling programs. DuPont runs a program in the United States where disposable clothing, coveralls, lab coats, medical packaging and other non-hazardous Tyvek disposable garments can be recycled, as well as providing a mail-in recycling program for envelopes.

As plastic bag recycling has become more prevalent in the United States, the American Chemistry Council has recommended that plastic film drop-off recycling locations should be able to accept Tyvek.

=== Properties of Tyvek ===
According to DuPont's website, Tyvek fibers are 0.5–10 μm (2.0×10^{−5}–0.000394 in) (compared to 75 μm (0.0030 in) for a human hair). The nondirectional fibers (plexifilaments) are first spun and then bonded by heat and pressure, without binders.

Tyvek is also:

- Lightweight
- Has a Class 1 flammability rating. "When exposed to a flame, Tyvek (R) shrinks away rapidly. If the flame is made to follow the shrinking sheet, Tyvek (R) will melt at 275 F (135 C)" and will burn at 750 °F (400 °C)
- Chemical-resistant
- Dimensionally stabilized
- Opaque
- Has a neutral pH
- Tear-resistant

== Uses ==
=== Construction/engineering ===
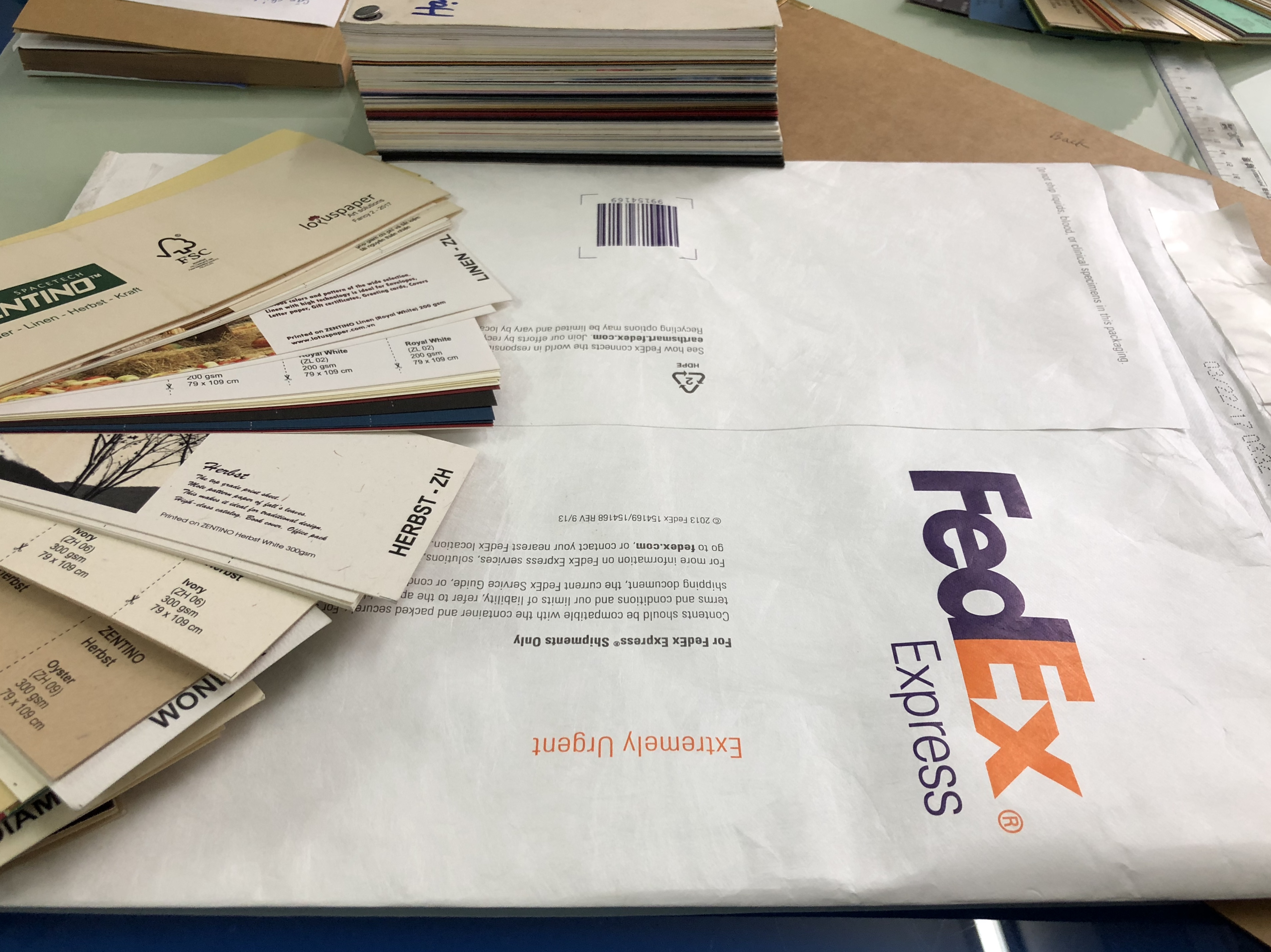
Tyvek envelopes

- Large sheets of Tyvek are frequently used as housewrap to provide an air barrier between the outer cladding of a structure and the frame, insulation, etc., allowing water vapor to pass but restricting air infiltration.
- During the latter years of the Space Shuttle program Tyvek was used to cover and protect the Reaction Control System (RCS) thruster ports from water and debris while the shuttle stack was exposed on the launchpad. The Tyvek covers were dislodged shortly after ignition and before the shuttle cleared the tower, posing no strike risk as the shuttle was travelling below 100 mph (160 km/h).
- Tom Sachs used Tyvek for the outer shell of the spacesuits used in his Space Program series of artworks.

=== Shipping ===
- Tyvek is used by the United States Postal Service for some of its Priority Mail and Express Mail envelopes.
- FedEx also uses it for some of its document envelopes.

=== Government use ===
- New Zealand used Tyvek for its driver's licences from 1986 to 1999.

=== Banknotes ===
- Costa Rica (solely their 20 colones bank note, Z series), the Isle of Man, and Haiti have made banknotes from Tyvek. These banknotes are no longer in circulation and have become collector's items.

=== Fashion/personal use ===
- Race bibs, or race numbers are often produced on Tyvek paper, so they are less likely to rip during competition.
- Tyvek is often used in garment and other textile labeling due to high durability and washability.
- Tyvek wristbands are used at music festivals, conventions, and like events where age-restricted admission and/or security are concerns, as well more generally at as hospitals, resorts, nightclubs, schools, and reunions.
- In 2011, fashion retailer and manufacturer American Apparel included white Tyvek shorts as part of its range.
- In 1976, fashion house Fiorucci made an entire collection out of Tyvek.
- The ultralight backpacking community has begun to use Tyvek for the construction of extremely light yet durable backpacks and tarps. In 2012, The Open Company released a foldable city map made of one of the stiffer variants of Tyvek.
- Increasingly, reused Tyvek material is being used by home crafters. Protective sleeves for CDs and DVDs, tote bags, and origami wallets also use Tyvek-containing materials.
- Tyvek is also used as a durable fabric in shoes.

=== Medical ===
- Tyvek is extensively used for laboratory and medical packaging as the material withstands conditions such as gamma irradiation or ethylene oxide gas which are used to sterilize equipment and surgical devices.
- NSW Police, Australia uses Tyvek overalls to preserve the integrity of forensic evidence at a crime scene, while also protecting "the wearer from the risk of exposure to biological substances, dirt and liquid splashes."
- Tyvek is widely used for medical wristbands. It offers a low risk of skin irritation and resistance to everyday contact with alcohol, povidone-iodine and perspiration.

=== Personal protective equipment (PPE) ===
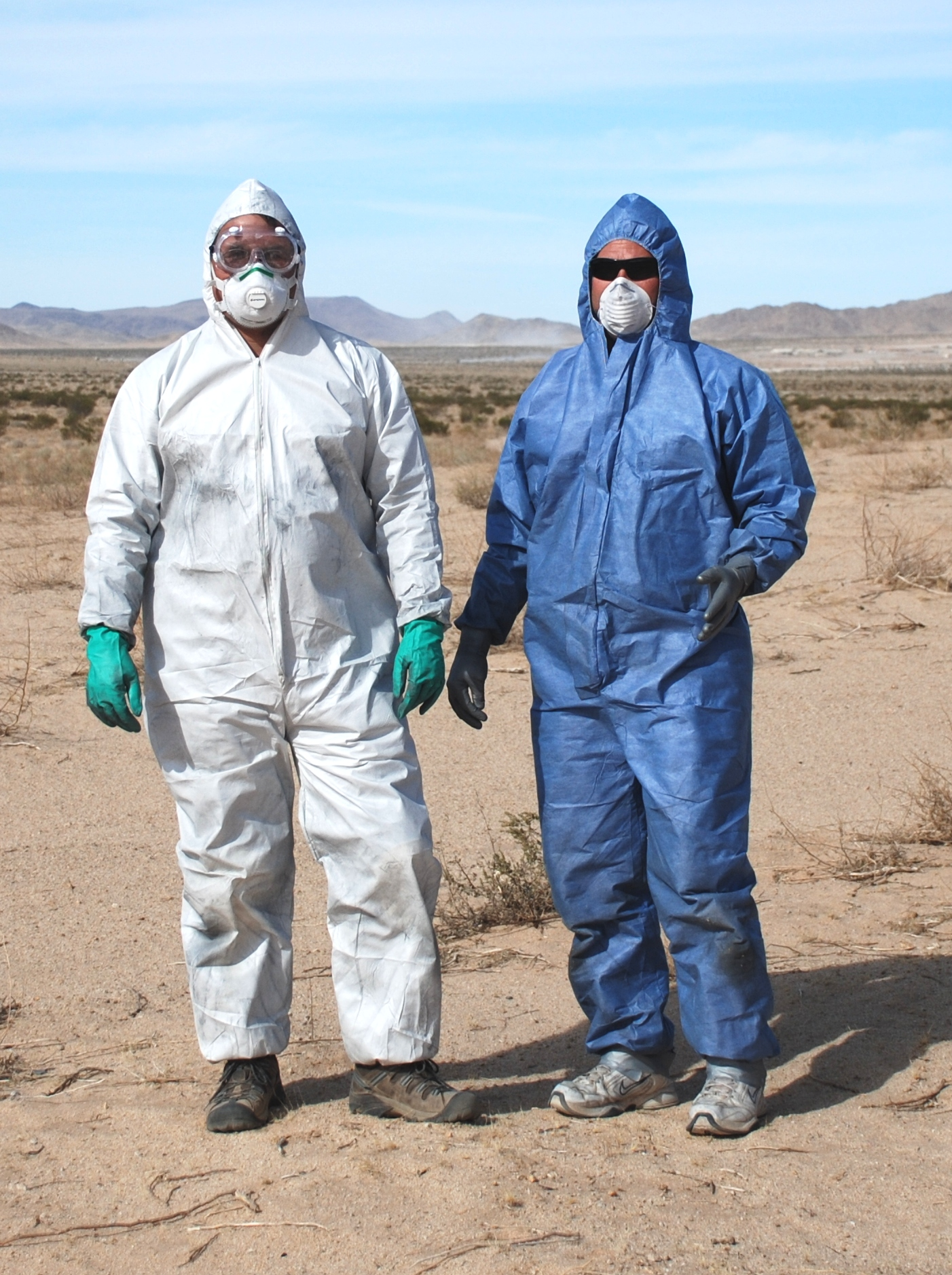
Tyvek coveralls

- Tyvek coveralls are one-piece garments used for personal protective equipment. They are usually white, commonly worn by mechanics, oil industry workers, painters, insulation installers, and laboratory and cleanroom workers where disposable, one-time use coverall is needed. They are also used for some light HAZMAT applications, such as asbestos and radiation work, but do not provide the protection of a full hazmat suit. Tychem is a sub-brand of Tyvek rated for a higher level of liquid protection, especially from chemicals. DuPont makes Tyvek clothing in different styles from laboratory coats and aprons to complete head-to-toe coveralls with hoods and booties. The latter was notably used by the Japan Ground Self-Defense Force as emergency limited CBRN gear during the Fukushima nuclear incident.
- Tyvek coveralls, coats or bodysuits are often used during pandemics, for example in the 2013–2016 Western African Ebola virus epidemic, and in the COVID-19 pandemic, to protect health care workers from infection. The Tyvek suits, which are most frequently used during the COVID-19 pandemic, are sold for between US$5 and US$15 per piece. Due to a lack of sufficient stock of adequate PPE during the coronavirus crisis, Tyvek PPE became scarce in many places. Tyvek bodysuits are generally meant for one-time use. However, Tychem suits contaminated with the virus SARS-CoV-2 can be disinfected and reused a limited number of times.

== See also ==
- Flashspinning for manufacturing process
- High-density polyethylene for material
- Olefin fiber (for brand names of related fabrics)
