= Flashspun fabric =

Nonwoven fabrics

Flashspun fabric is a nonwoven fabric formed from fine fibrillation of a film by the rapid evaporation of solvent and subsequent bonding during extrusion.

A pressurised solution of, for example, high-density polyethylene (HDPE) or polypropylene in a solvent such as fluoroform is heated, pressurised and pumped through a hole into a chamber. When the solution is allowed to expand rapidly through the hole, the solvent evaporates to leave a highly oriented non-woven network of filaments.

== See also ==
- Tyvek
- Melt blowing
