= Fire resistance =

Fire resistance may refer to:

- Fire resistance (ecology), a quality of plants that are harmed but not killed by fire
- Fire retardant, a substance used to slow down or stop the spread of fire or reduce its intensity
- Fireproofing, a passive fire protection method
  - Fire-resistance rating, an indication of the ability for a passive fire protection system to withstand a standard fire resistance test
- Flame retardant, chemicals added to manufactured materials
  - Fire-retardant fabric
