= Marlan =

Marlan is a given name. Notable people with the name include:

- Marlan Coughtry (born 1934), former backup infielder in Major League Baseball
- Marlan O. Scully, physicist best known for his work in theoretical quantum optics
- Marlann Flores, a Filipina actress

== See also ==
- Marlan (fabric), flame retardant fabric used in protective clothing for foundries
- UC Riverside Marlan and Rosemary Bourns College of Engineering
