= Biotextile =

Specialized materials engineered from natural or synthetic fibers

Biotextiles are specialized materials engineered from natural or synthetic fibers. These textiles are designed to interact with biological systems, offering properties such as biocompatibility, porosity, and mechanical strength or are designed to be environmentally friendly for typical household applications. There are several uses for biotextiles since they are a broad category. The most common uses are for medical or household use. However, this term may also refer to textiles constructed from biological waste products. These biotextiles are not typically used for industrial purposes.

The term "biotextiles" derives from the combination of "bio," referring to biology or living organisms, and "textiles," indicating woven or fibrous materials. It encompasses the interdisciplinary field of biomedical textiles, which focuses on the design, fabrication, and application of textile materials in healthcare and biomedical engineering. Biotextiles made from mycelium, vegetable biomass, bacterial cellulose, and recombinant protein based fibers are used as an alternative to synthetic textiles to prevent and reduce the high greenhouse gas emissions, water pollution, and landfill waste from the textile industry. Biotextiles are also used within healthcare and the biomedical engineering field as implantable devices such as surgical sutures, hernia repair fabrics, arterial grafts, artificial skin and parts of artificial hearts.

== Introduction ==
The field of biotextiles has garnered significant attention due to its potential to revolutionize the textile industry by offering sustainable alternatives to conventional and environmentally harmful fabrics. Central to this innovation are raw materials derived from nature's own processes, including mycelium, bacterial cellulose and vegetable and fruit biomass. These natural ingredients have potential to become a reliable source for the development of eco-friendly textiles, addressing issues with environmental degradation and ingredient depletion associated with traditional textile production. Processing of these materials offer abundant sources of natural fibers. Using the fibrous structures found in these materials and plant tissues, such as cotton, hemp, flax and more, its possible to create biodegradable and renewable textiles. Washing, drying and a variety of spinning techniques are common for processing of all textiles but the processing for biotextiles is expected to produce less environmentally harmful waste products due to the bio-remedial nature of many of the natural materials. Furthermore, advancements in processing have enabled the extraction of fibers for fashion from unconventional sources, including pineapple, banana, citrus fruits, animal byproducts and bone. These new developments make large contributions to the world of innovative fashion.

== Mycelium-based textiles ==
Mycelium, the vegetative part of fungi, has emerged as a versatile and sustainable raw material for biotextiles. Mycelium typically grows underground or within its substrate such as soil, wood, decaying organic matter or waste residues. In mycelium-based biocomposites, the fungus consumes the carbohydrates to produce hyphae, a network of branching, thread-like structures. Through controlled growth processes, mycelium can be cultivated into a dense network of interwoven fibers, forming a durable biodegradable matrix suitable for textile applications. This cultivation depends on the temperature, moisture and pH of the media.

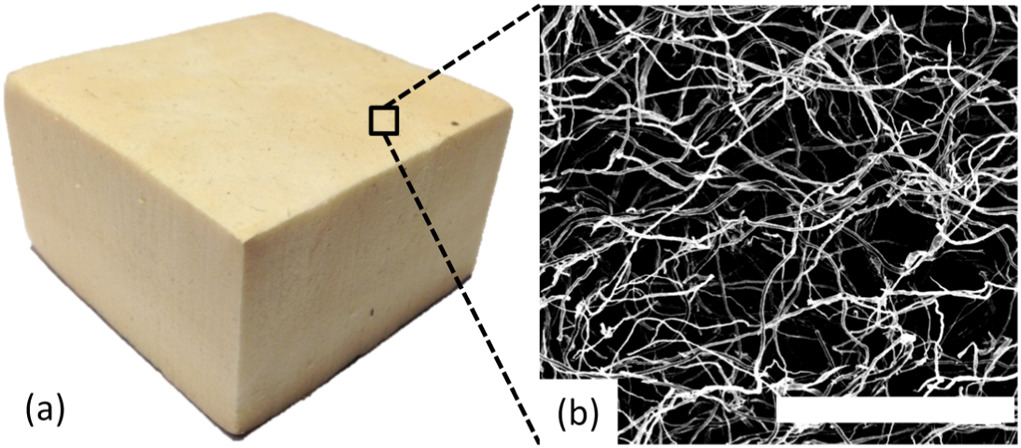
Microscopic image of the structure of Mycelium which contains a layering of protein, glucan and chitin

=== Pleurotus ostreatus ===
The commonly known fungal species, white-rot basidiomycetes, are capable of degrading polymeric carbohydrates and using them for growth. Pleurotus ostreatus is an edible white-rot fungus known to degrade cellulose, hemicellulose and lignin, hence reinforcing its potential to thrive on wastes such as wood, textile, and agricultural residues. The growth of P. ostreatus on textile residue and mycelium production was tested in the department of civil engineering in Ontario Canada. The conducted experiment proved the applicability of textile waste as a potential feedstock. However, the loss in biocomposite weight of 1%–5% has been further corroborated by the water loss in the sample and in fungal mycelium. Additionally, the maximum compressive strength was observed as 270 kPa using cotton-based biocomposite. Overall, a lightweight biocomposite was obtained which could be a potential alternative for polystyrene- based products. These findings show the ability of the fungus to thrive on polyester plastic in textiles and provide an alternative for converting this plastic material into bio-based materials. Additionally, by varying the mycelium growth, the plasticity and stiffness properties of the resultant biocomposite can be changed.

=== β-glucan/chitin complex ===
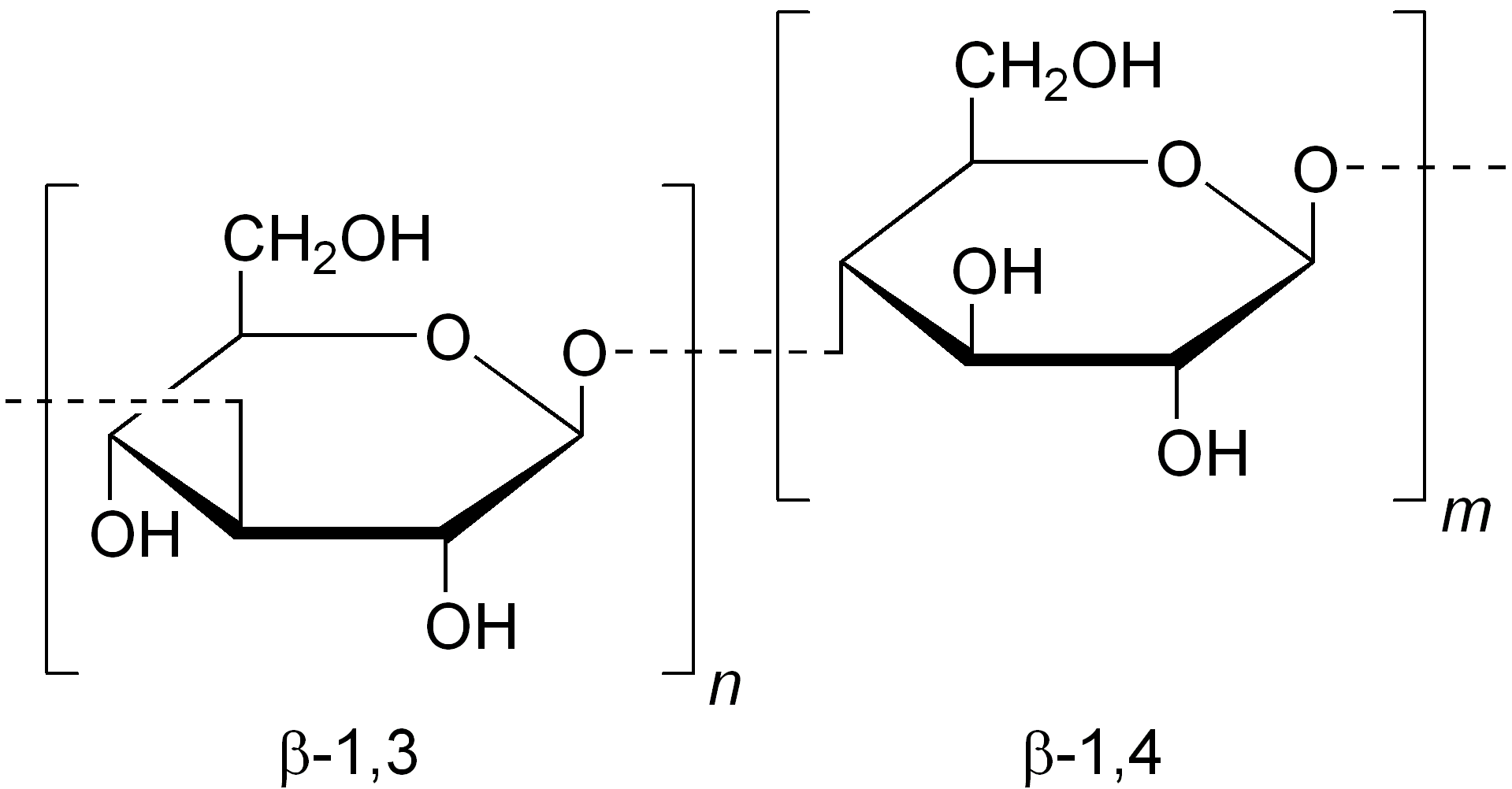
Molecular Structure of Beta-Glucan

The β-glucan/chitin complex refers to the combination of two natural polysaccharides (β-glucan and chitin) found in fungal cell walls. This complex is a major component found in a variety of fungal cell walls and are also found in certain plants, algae, and bacteria. β-glucan contributes to the structural strength of the cell wall and plays roles in cell signaling, immune modulation and defense against pathogens. Chitin is a long-chain polymer of N-acetylglucosamine units, linked by β-glycosidic bonds. It provides structural support and protection to fungal cells, contributing to their rigidity and resilience. The addition of this complex to the growth components that make up the initial matrix that is the base of these emerging biotextiles provides a significant effect on the durability and usefulness of the processed result.

Molecular Structure of Chitin

== Vegetable biomass-based textiles ==
Polysaccharide-based polymers are made of fruit and vegetable origin, and the most promising biopolymer-yielding fibers include cellulose, starch, chitin/chitosan, pectin, alginate, and carrageenan. Soy, whey, and zein could also be obtained from vegetable sources. An example is Pinatex, a pineapple-based leather that is manufactured from the cellulose fibers of pineapple leaves. It is an environmentally friendly alternative to traditional leather due to its sustainability and adaptability. Additionally its lightweight, resilient and biodegradable nature has made it very popular for new and innovative fashion.

=== Algae-derived fibers (Alginate) ===
Alginate is a polysaccharide generated by brown algae, seaweed and specific species of bacteria.

Bacteria and seaweed alginate differ in composition, modifications, molecular mass, viscoelasticity, and polydispersity. These unique qualities lead to a wide range of applications, including alginate's development of nanoparticles, nanotubes, microspheres, and microcapsules. Furthermore, the different types of sponges, hydrogels, foams, elastomers, and fibers that can be created with its growth and processing. It is widely employed in many facets of industrial fabrication. Alginate is commonly employed as a gelling agent, thickener, and stabilizer in a large variety of food products. Its ability to form gels under mild conditions makes it particularly useful for encapsulating flavors, vitamins, and other active ingredients. It is also used to develop hydrogels, printing pastes and sizing agents in biomedical, textile, cosmetic and agricultural industries. In the textile industry specifically, textile coatings, binders and finishes are the bulk of what alginate is used for, rather than formulating threads itself it reinforces the strength of other materials.

== Bacterial cellulose-based textiles ==
Unlike plant-derived cellulose, bacterial cellulose offers superior mechanical properties, such as high tensile strength and flexibility, making it an attractive option for a wide range of textile applications. Moreover, the cultivation of bacterial cellulose can be achieved using simple fermentation processes, minimizing the environmental footprint associated with traditional textile manufacturing. Yeast, fungi and algae species including: the bacterium Pseudomonas fluorescens, the yeast Yarrowia lipolytica, the sponge Acanthella elongata, the algae Stoechospermum marginatum, and the fungus Candida albicans have all been researched for their ability to be used on substrates to create natural composites for biotextiles.

=== Yeast ===
Yeast is a single cell, fungal organism widely found in nature and plays important roles in various biological processes. Some species of yeast, such as Gluconacetobacter xylinus, are capable of producing cellulose through fermentation. This cultivation depends on the temperature, moisture and pH of the media. During fermentation, the yeast produces cellulose as an extracellular matrix, forming a dense network of cellulose fibers. This microbial cellulose can then be harvested, purified, and processed into textile fibers. This process is not consistent for most species of yeast though. The microbial cellulose produced by most yeast species can be processed into textile fibers after being reinforced with other natural or synthetic fibers using techniques such as spinning, weaving, or knitting. Depending on the desired characteristics, properties such as strength, softness, or moisture absorption can be controlled. The resulting textile materials can be used to produce a variety of products, including apparel, home textiles, and technical textiles. Using yeast in the biotextile industry contains many environmentally friendly and cost effective perks. Yeast fermentation can be carried out using renewable feedstocks such as agricultural residues, waste streams, or plant-based sugars, reducing reliance on finite resources and minimizing environmental impact. Additionally, microbial cellulose production is highly efficient, with relatively low energy and water requirements compared to conventional textile manufacturing processes. An emerging method in the creation of biotextiles is growing engineered yeast as cell factories that produce target proteins in succession. Other recent advances in synthetic biology and fermentation processes enable high-level expressions of recombinant proteins, using bacteria, yeasts, animal cells, and plants as biofactories.

== Recombinant protein-based textiles ==
Collagen, fibroin, gelatin, casein, and actin are naturally from animal products. Collagen and silk are the most attractive biopolymers for developing biotextiles.

Collagen can be produced from a plethora of organisms and renewable sources. Collagen's repeating amino acid sequence allows it to form a stable secondary protein structure of triple helices. These helices can further assemble into quaternary structures, allowing collagen to take on the form of fibrillar proteins. These protein building blocks could biofabricate abrasion-resistant, water-resistant, breathable, lightweight and durable materials with characteristics similar to leather. Natural silk has remarkable strength. The fibroin protein in silk consists of long, repetitive chains of amino acids, predominantly glycine, alanine, and serine. These amino acids are arranged in a specific sequence, forming a unique molecular structure that contributes to silk's remarkable properties. Silk has high tensile strength that can be attributed to its nano-crystalline and molecular structure (hydrogen bonds & β-sheet structure) and high degree of orientation. Significant efforts have been made to obtain recombinant silk fibroin, principally from the spider, dragline, or silkworm through genetic alteration. The developed protein is later isolated and processed into threads by techniques such as spinning.

=== Biosynthetic Spider Silk in E. coli ===
Ancient Greeks and Romans used spider silk to stop bleeding and aid wound healing and in more modern history, indigenous people in the Solomon Islands as well as Aboriginals created fishing setups from spider silk utilizing it as fishing line. One of the most common methods of producing spider silk biosynthetically utilizes bacteria, such as Escherichia coli (E. coli). The E. coli cell DNA is engineered to express spider silk genes, producing spidroin proteins within the cells. These proteins are then extracted, purified and spun into fibers. While E. coli can produce relatively high yields (e.g., up to 2,700 mg/liter for some MaSp1 variants), process efficiency is very low and many challenges remain in ensuring proper protein folding and solubility for optimal fiber properties, especially for larger spidroin constructs which often cause cell toxicity and death.

The table below provides the mechanical properties of the spider silk from a few species to establish a general overview of the mechanical properties. There are then listed a few notable biosynthetic spider silk examples produced in E. coli from recent work.

Mechanical Properties of Select Natural and Biosynthetic Spider Silk Examples
Species or Source	Fracture strength (Fs) or Tenacity (T) (MPa)	Ultimate strain (%)	Young's modulus (MPa)	Toughness (MJ/m^{3})
P. dehaani	396.94±12.91 (Fs)	15.93±2.10	3833.20±1056.21	41.50±8.35
H. ornatissima	682.95±74.52 (Fs)	13.53±2.11	5705.04±1577.15	55.16±14.74
N. malabarensis	516.51±86.23 (Fs)	15.35±2.84	5450.61±1334.83	49.86±12.68
Xia et al., 2010	508±108 (T)	15±5	2100+40	N.D.
Thamm and Scheibel, 2017	282±66 (Fs)	102±24	1500±300	144±44
Bhattacharyya et al., 2021	151.82 (Fs)	0.408	N.D.	50.98

There is a wide variety in the mechanical properties achievable in biosynthetic spider silk depending on the spidroin sequences used, spinning method, native spider species and whether efficiency in production or maximum mechanical properties are emphasized.

== Manufacture of biotextiles ==
=== Preface ===
The processing of different materials is determined by the origin of their species and substrate. While vegetable and fruit biomass-based textiles are formed into sheets, biotextiles made from proteins or bacterial cellulose are commonly drawn out during an extrusion and spun into a stronger thread. By cultivating plant and bacterial species on a determined substrate, it is possible to grow materials by harnessing their ability to digest and transform cellulose into natural composites. This process involves collecting them into proper scaffolds and executing physical and chemical treatment, so that these sheets of biomass visually resemble leather and exhibit comparable material and tactile properties. The processing of protein based textiles involves a variety of spinning techniques based on the type and quality that needs to be achieved.

=== Manufacturing of biotextiles ===
Before the production of biotextiles, monofilament structures were typically produced using extrusion techniques, where a single continuous filament was drawn from a polymer melt. These monofilaments can then be used directly or further processed into various biomedical devices, such as sutures, meshes, and vascular grafts. Biotextiles are created using multiple techniques, such as knitting, weaving, and braiding, to form the fabric-like structures used in biomedical applications. The three primary spinning techniques traditionally employed in fiber manufacturing are wet-spinning, dry-spinning, and melt-spinning.

Polymeric Matrix	Processing Method	Bio-Application	Reference
PLA/CNW	Melt-spinning	-	
PHBV/PLA	Melt-spinning	Textile implants	
PLGA	Dry/wet and wet-spinning	Scaffolds production	
CS	Dry-spinning	Tissue regeneration	
PCL	Wet-spinning	Regeneration of smooth muscle cells	
GN	Wet-spinning	Tissue regeneration	
GN/SA	Wet-spinning	Enzyme immobilization	
PCL	Wet-spinning	Regeneration of smooth muscle cells	
Collagen	Wet-spinning	-	
CA	Wet-spinning	Drug delivery systems	
PCL	Electrospinning	Tendon graft	
GN	Electrospinning	Wound healing	
CS/SF	Electrospinning	Wound healing	

Table1. The processing methods and applications of Biotextile

==== Electrospinning ====
Electrospinning is a technique that uses electrostatic forces to produce ultra fine fibers from polymer solutions or melts. These fibers have unique properties like large surface areas and high porosity, making them valuable for biomedical applications. Polymer solutions are ejected through a needle onto a collector plate by applying an electric field, forming nanofibers. These scaffolds show promise in tissue engineering, aiding in regenerating various human tissues and organs such as bone, skin, blood vessels, liver, and kidneys. They closely resemble the native extracellular matrix, facilitating cell attachment and proliferation. Electrospinning offers a versatile method for creating biocompatible scaffolds with simple structures for tissue engineering.

==== Melt spinning ====
Melt-spinning is a cost-effective method widely used in the textile industry for producing polymeric fibers without solvents. However, its application in biostructures is limited due to factors such as polymer decomposition at lower temperatures, inadequate control over melt temperature during spinning, and challenges in controlling the final fiber structure. In this process, polymer granules are melted in an extruder to form a spinning dope, then extruded through a spinneret and rapidly cooled to solidify the filament. Despite its drawbacks, melt-spinning of biopolymers has been explored for various bio-applications. The use of bio-based reinforcements is being investigated as a solution to overcome challenges associated with producing biotextiles via melt-spinning.

==== Dry spinning ====
Dry-spinning, an ancient spinning method, dissolves polymers in solvents, unlike melt-spinning. Polymer solutions are extruded through a spinneret and then passed through a heating column where the solvent evaporates, leaving dry fibers. Highly volatile solvents are needed for this process. Steam or hot air is utilized to solidify fibers and remove solvent. This technique suits polymers prone to thermal degradation and those unable to form viscous melts, offering specific surface characteristics. Traditional dry-spun polymers include acetate, triacetate, acrylics, modacrylics, aramid, and spandex fibers. Besides being complex and costly due to recovery processes and mass transfer mechanisms during solvent evaporation, dry-spinning provides fibers with unique properties.

==== Wet spinning ====
Wet-spinning, introduced with rayon fiber production, involves dissolving polymers in a suitable solvent before extrusion. Unlike dry-spinning, the solvent need not be volatile. During wet-spinning, the polymeric solution is extruded through a spinneret into a coagulation bath, leading to a phase inversion and precipitation. Natural and synthetic polymers, including gelatin, alginate, collagen, and cellulose, are processed into fibers via wet-spinning for various tissue engineering applications. This technique enables the production of fibers with large diameters and architectures with high porosity and interconnected open pore structures, facilitating cell penetration, adhesion, and proliferation.

==== Gel spinning ====
Gel spinning produces fibers with exceptional strength or other unique qualities. During extrusion, the polymer is not in a pure liquid condition. The polymer chains are linked at different locations in liquid crystal form, partially apart as they would be in a real solution. The resultant filaments have substantial inter-chain forces, which can significantly raise the fiber's tensile strength additionally, the shear forces the liquid crystals to be arranged along the fiber axis during extrusion. Strength is further enhanced by the filaments' exceptionally high degree of alignment as they emerge from one another. Due to the filaments' first air-to-cool cooling phase, the method is known as dry-wet spinning.

==== Solution spinning ====
Solution spinning, encompassing wet and dry-jet wet spinning, creates continuous fibers from materials incapable of withstanding melting. This technique is applicable to manufacturing fibers from natural polymers and bio-based materials like cellulose, lignin, and proteins. As it relies on polymer solutions, solution spinning offers significant potential to enhance the functionality of wet-spun fibers through targeted formulations.

==== Grafting ====
In biotextiles, grafting onto surfaces refers to the process of attaching or bonding functional molecules, such as proteins, peptides, or polymers, onto the surface of textile materials. This process is often performed to modify the surface properties of textiles, such as enhancing biocompatibility, promoting cell adhesion, or enabling controlled drug release. Grafting onto surfaces can be achieved through various techniques, including chemical modification, plasma treatment, or surface coating methods. These modified biotextiles find applications in biomedical fields such as tissue engineering, wound healing, and medical implants, where tailored surface properties are critical for desired biological interactions.

==== Rotary jet spinning ====
Rotary jet spinning is a technique used in the production of biotextiles, which involves the extrusion of polymer solutions or melts through a rapidly rotating spinneret. As the polymer solution or melt exits the spinneret, it is subjected to centrifugal forces, forming fine fibers. These fibers are collected to create a nonwoven fabric or scaffold structure suitable for various biomedical applications. Rotary jet spinning offers advantages such as producing highly porous structures with controllable fiber diameter and alignment, making it promising for tissue engineering and drug delivery applications in biomedicine.

== Use and applications ==
=== Consumer textile/fashion industry ===
==== Goat silk as milk byproduct ====
Researchers at the University of Wyoming have devised a method to introduce spider silk-spinning genes into goats, enabling the extraction of silk protein from the goats' milk. This innovation has applications in various fields, including medicine, where the strength and elasticity of spider silk has been argued to be utilized in artificial ligaments, tendons, eye sutures, and jaw repair.

Traditionally, obtaining spider silk in sufficient quantities necessitates managing large populations of spiders, which often leads to territorial conflicts and cannibalism within the farmed spider population. To circumvent this challenge, scientists have genetically engineered goats to produce the silk protein exclusively in their milk. Through selective breeding, a percentage of the offspring inherit the silk protein gene, leading to higher yields of the silk protein.

The transgenic goats exhibit no discernible differences in health, appearance, or behavior compared to non-transgenic counterparts. In the future, the researchers aim to transfer silk genes into alfalfa plants, a move the researchers expect to further increase silk production. Researchers believe that alfalfa's widespread distribution and high protein content make it a promising candidate for large-scale silk protein synthesis.

==== Fruit waste textiles ====
In a collaboration between Danish fashion brand Ganni and Mexican biomaterials company Polybion, a unique prototype blazer was created using bacterial cellulose derived from industrial fruit waste. Unlike traditional leather, it has been stated that this fruit textile is environmentally friendly, with a significantly smaller carbon footprint.

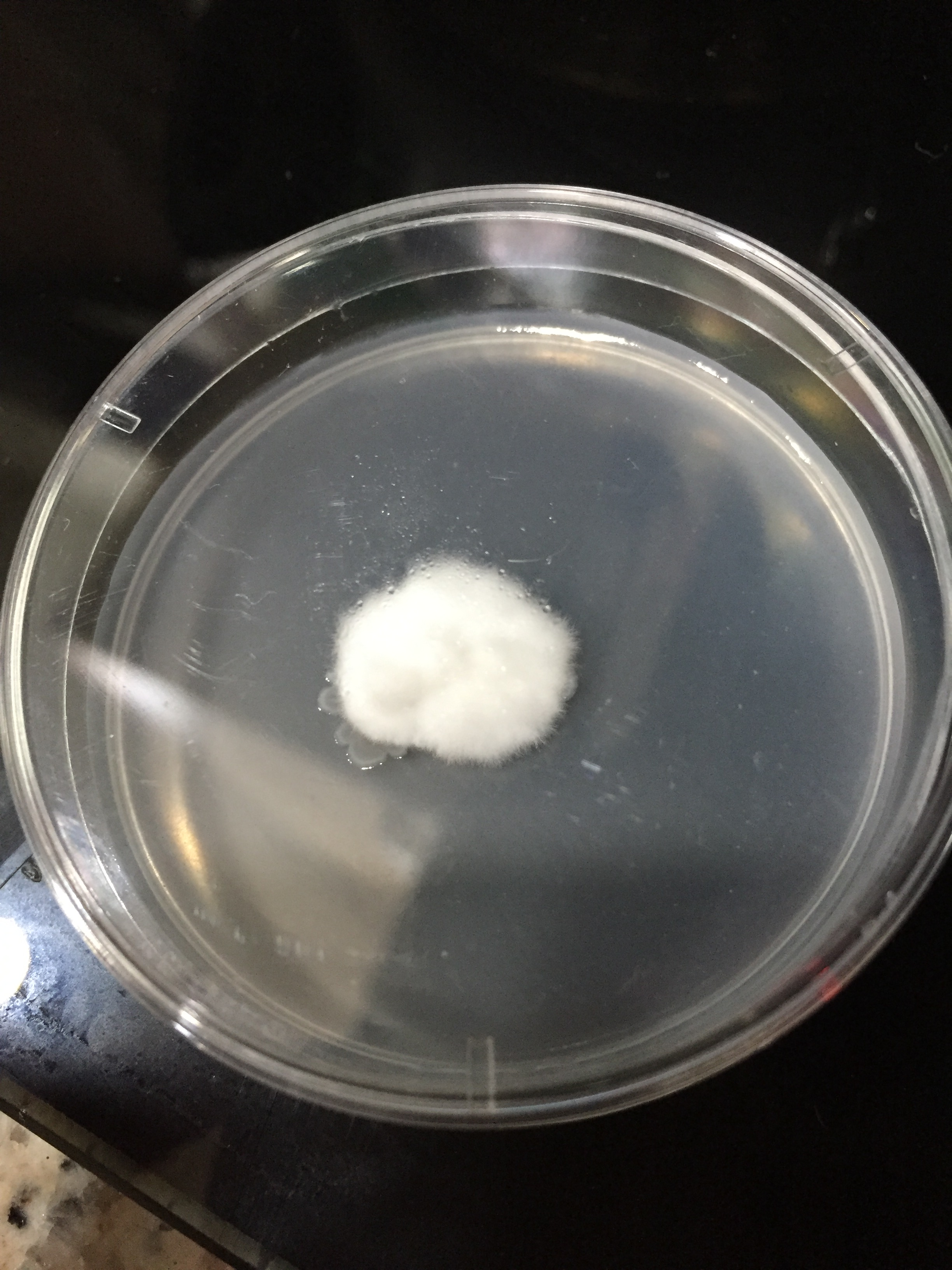
A very general example of how mycelium can be grown

A wide variety of fruit waste, particularly from mangoes, serves as the feedstock for the bacteria, transforming it into a growth medium. The resulting bacterial biomass, known as Celium, undergoes a tanning and finishing process similar to that of leather, yielding a durable material.

==== Mycelium textiles ====
Mycelium textiles start with a chosen substrate inoculated with fungal spores or mycelium culture. In a controlled environment, the mycelium grows throughout the substrate, forming a dense network of fibers. Once fully colonized, it is shaped and dried to create the desired form, undergoing additional treatments for properties like density or surface finish.

Mycelium textiles are a sustainable alternative to traditional textiles, made from the root structure of fungi. Mycelium, the vegetative part of fungi, can be grown into various shapes and forms, including textiles. These textiles are eco-friendly, biodegradable, and can be engineered to possess desired properties like flexibility, durability, and water resistance. It has been stated that this material is leathery.

=== Biomedical applications ===
==== Biotextile scaffolds for tissue regeneration ====
The development of a collagen biotextile scaffold for aiding in the healing process of large deep burn wounds has been achieved by researchers at UC Davis. This scaffold, utilizing a specially engineered biomaterial, has demonstrated efficacy in promoting the formation of new blood vessels and reducing complications associated with severe burns.

The study highlights the scaffold's ability to accelerate wound healing in mouse models and mitigate burn-related complications such as fluid loss and infection. Through testing different scaffold types, the research team observed that the combined treatment loaded with endothelial cells exhibited the highest wound healing rate.

==== Biotextile meshes ====
In the new paradigm of tissue engineering, professionals are trying to develop new textiles so that the body can form new tissue around these devices so it's not relying solely on synthetic foreign implanted material. Graduate student Jessica Gluck has demonstrated that viable and functioning liver cells can be grown on textile scaffolds.

== Environment and health impacts ==
The textile industry is one of the largest polluters of water and agricultural lands. This industry has caused numerous negative impacts on the environment as well as on the health of humans and ecosystems. Water pollution due to the discharge of wastewater containing textile dyes is the biggest environmental and ecological concerns due to the textile industry. There are several health concerns due to the discharge of wastewater contaminating with textile dyes such as respiratory problems, skin irritation, allergic reactions, and cancer. Biotextiles such as nettle and hemp denim are starting to be used as a replacement to use for synthetic textiles within the textile industry to try and prevent these negative environmental and health impacts.

=== Environmental impacts ===
There are several negative environmental impacts due to the modern day textile industry such as the discharge of textile dyes and pigments into wastewater, greenhouse gas emissions from production, energy and resource intensive production, and large amounts of landfill waste. Water pollution is the greatest environment concern since pigments and textile dyes do not naturally biodegrade over time, which causes direct health concerns for both humans and ecosystem wildlife.

==== Degradation of materials ====
One of the biggest concerns of the modern day textile industry is that synthetic textiles do not biodegrade over time. Approximately 700,000 tons of dyes are being used in the textile industry every year. 10 to 15 percent of the dyes that are used during clothing production remain unfixed dyes. These dyes and pigments contaminate wastewater and discharge into local water bodies. Approximately 20 percent of wastewater produced globally is from the textile industry. Textile dyes degrade the aesthetic quality of these local water bodies and prevent sunlight from penetrating through the surface water. These dyes harm aquatic ecosystems since water pollution impairs photosynthesis and leads to a hypoxic environment unable to support life. Textile dyes contamination also harm humans since the toxins within these dyes can bioaccumulate and biomagnify throughout the food chain, causing health concerns to species at the top of the food chain such as humans.

The application of bacterial isolates offers a promising solution to improve water quality in dye contaminated marine environments. Bacterial isolates degrade and remove textile dyes from wastewater through several methods, including biodegradation and biosorption of dyes. They have the ability to biodegrade complex dye molecules into simple one through enzymatic reactions. Bacterial isolates break down the dye molecules by reducing their color and toxicity, which improves ecosystems. There are many advantages to biodegradation, including a high dye removal efficiency, low cost, and the fact that many microorganisms such as bacteria, fungi, algae and enzymes can be used. However, the disadvantages are that this process requires a favorable environment for these microorganisms to grow, it generates biological sludge and is a slow process. Bacterial isolates can also adsorb complex dye molecules onto the surface of their cells. This adsorption process involves the physical binding of dye molecules to bacterial cell walls, and then the removal of these isolates from wastewater. The advantages of this process are that it has a high dye removal efficiency and a short reaction time. There are disadvantages as well since this processes is not applicable to all types of dyes and it generates a toxic waste product.

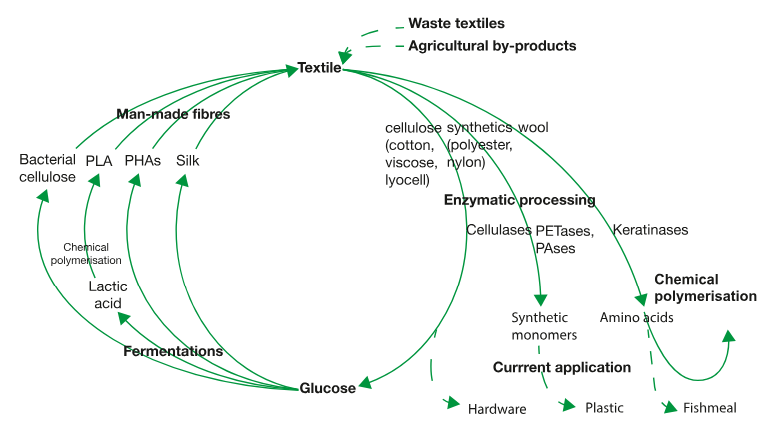
Closed Recycling Loop for Biological Textiles

==== Closed-loop recycling ====
There are several other harmful environmental impact from synthetic textile production, including large amount of greenhouse gas emissions, high energy consumption and landfill waste. A typical textile mill consumes approximately 1.6 million liters of water to produce 8,000 kilograms of fabric. This is a worldwide problem since the textile industry contributes to about 10 percent of global greenhouse gas emissions. During 2016 alone, only 1 percent of the 180,000 tons of textile waste produced was recycled into new clothes. The remaining old textile fibers ended up in a landfill as waste.

One solution that is currently being implemented within the textile industry to combat these issues is a closed loop recycling system. In the context of the textile industry, closed loop recycling involves collecting used textiles, processing them through various mechanical, chemical or biological recycling methods to turn used, worn down textiles into new textiles. Within a closed loop recycling system, textiles can either be recycled into a similar product, upcycled into a new, higher quality product, or downcycled into a new, lower quality product. This approach reduces waste, conserves resources, and minimizes the environmental impact of textile production by promoting a circular economy where materials are recycled and reused in a continuous, closed loop. As demonstrated in the figure, the enzyme groups cellulase, PETase, and keratinase are used within the closed recycling loop to break down old textiles such as polyester and nylon into amino acids, glucose, or synthetic monomer building blocks. These monomers then undergo chemical polymerization and are combined to create high quality polylactic acid (PLA), polyhydroxyalkanoates (PHAs), silk, and bacterial cellulose polymers. Afterwards, these synthesized polymers are used to create man made, biodegradable fibers, which are then used to make new, biodegradable textiles. These textiles are used until their become worn down and are depolymerized to continue the closed recycling loop.

==== Sustainable biotextiles ====
Biotextiles are used as an alternative to synthetic textiles to prevent and combat the excess amounts of water and waste pollution from the textile industry. Large brands such as Nike, Adidas, Hermes and Stella McCartney are starting to use biotextiles for some of their fashion collections. One solution created by sustainable textile companies such as Pangaia and Agraloop is denim made out of nettle and hemp plants. Nettle plants are a renewable, biodegradable resource that can be used to design nettle denim by mixing organic cotton and Himalayan nettle. Hemp is another plant that is being looked into as an alternative denim material by these two companies since it is more durable and only consumes about a tenth of the water needed for cotton.

The company Collina Strada is developing another biotextile solution called rose sylk. Rose sylk is an organic, biodegradable cellulose fiber that is derived from the natural waste of rose stems and bushes. Collina Strada promotes upcycling and reuse of old textiles by using factories to turn Ghana's textile waste materials into insulation for coats and houses. A third solution involves clothing made from a pineapple based leather alternative, which is currently being used by major brands such as Nike, Hugo Boss and H&M. This pineapple leather alternative is made from cellulose fibers extracted from pineapple leaves and stalks. The use of agriculture pineapple waste instead of traditional leather has prevented approximately 264 tons of carbon dioxide from being emitted into the atmosphere, reducing greenhouse gas emissions.

=== Health impacts ===
There are several negative health impacts due to the discharge of wastewater containing textile dyes into local water bodies. These health issues include respiratory problems, skin irritation, allergic reactions, and cancer. Some of the respiratory problems that textile dyes cause are coughing, wheezing, asthma, and sneezing. Textile dye contamination causes skin irritation and allergic reaction symptoms such as itchy and watery eyes, sore eyes, an irritated and blocked nose and sniffling. Additionally, wastewater effluent containing both textile dyes and trace metals can cause long term health issues such as severe skin irritation, dermatitis, skin ulcerations, and even cancer.

==== Biocompatibility ====
Biocompatibility of textiles with the human body is of utmost importance when analyzing how both synthetic and biotextiles affect human health. The materials used to create textiles need to be compatible with human bodies and other animals to avoid negative health impacts from happening to these organisms. Synthetic textiles cause many negative health effects on both humans and ecosystem wildlife because they persist in the environment and do not biodegrade over time. Biotextiles, on the other hand, do not cause any known negative health concerns to humans or animals since they are produced with naturally occurring biological sources that can easily biodegrade over time.

== See also ==
- Technical textiles
- Biomaterials
- Mycelium-based materials
- Textiles
