= Synthetic fiber =

Artificially manufactured fibers, often based on polymers

Synthetic fibers or synthetic fibres (in British English; see spelling differences) are fibers made by humans through chemical synthesis, as opposed to natural fibers that are directly derived from living organisms, such as plants like cotton or fur from animals. They are the result of extensive research by scientists aimed at replicating naturally occurring animal and plant fibers. In general, synthetic fibers are created by extruding fiber-forming materials through spinnerets, forming a fiber. These are called synthetic or artificial fibers. The word 'polymer' comes from the Greek prefix 'poly,' which means 'many,' and the suffix 'mer,' which means 'single units'. (Note: each single unit of a polymer is called a monomer).

== The first synthetic fibers ==
Hilaire de Chardonnet, a French engineer and industrialist, invented the first artificial silk, which he called "Chardonnet silk". In the late 1870s, Chardonnet was working with Louis Pasteur on a remedy to the epidemic that was destroying French silkworms. Failure to clean up a spill in the darkroom resulted in Chardonnet's discovery of nitrocellulose as a potential replacement for real silk. Realizing the value of such a discovery, Chardonnet began to develop his new product, which he displayed at the Paris Exhibition of 1889. Chardonnet's material was extremely flammable, and was subsequently replaced with other, more stable materials.

== Commercial products ==
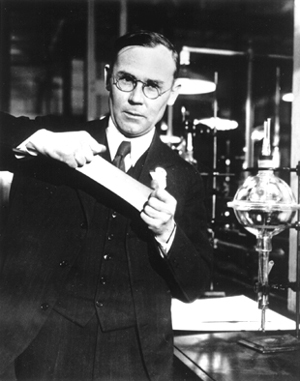
Nylon was first synthesized by Wallace Carothers at DuPont.

The first successful process was developed in 1894 by English chemist Charles Frederick Cross and his collaborators Edward John Bevan and Clayton Beadle. They named the fiber "viscose". This was because the reaction product of carbon disulfide and cellulose under alkaline conditions gave a highly viscous solution of xanthate. The first commercial viscose rayon was produced by the UK company Courtaulds in 1905. The name "rayon" was adopted in 1924, with "viscose" being used for the viscous organic liquid used to make both rayon and cellophane. A similar product known as cellulose acetate was discovered in 1865. Rayon and acetate are both artificial fibers, but not truly synthetic, being made from wood.

Nylon, the first synthetic fiber in the "fully synthetic" sense of that term, was developed by Wallace Carothers, an American researcher brought to chemical firm DuPont in 1927. The first nylon was nylon 66, synthesized on February 28, 1935. Nylon made its debut in the United States as a replacement for silk just in time for the introduction of rationing during World War II. Its novel use as a material for women's stockings overshadowed more practical uses, such as a replacement for the silk in parachutes and other military uses like ropes.

The first polyester fiber was patented in Britain in 1928 by the International General Electric company. It was also produced by British chemists working at the Calico Printers' Association, John Rex Whinfield and James Tennant Dickson, in 1941. They produced and patented one of the first polyester fibers which they named Terylene, also known as Dacron, equal to or surpassing nylon in toughness and resilience. ICI and DuPont went on to produce their own versions of the fiber.

The world production of synthetic fibers was 55.2 million tonnes in 2014.

== Descriptions ==
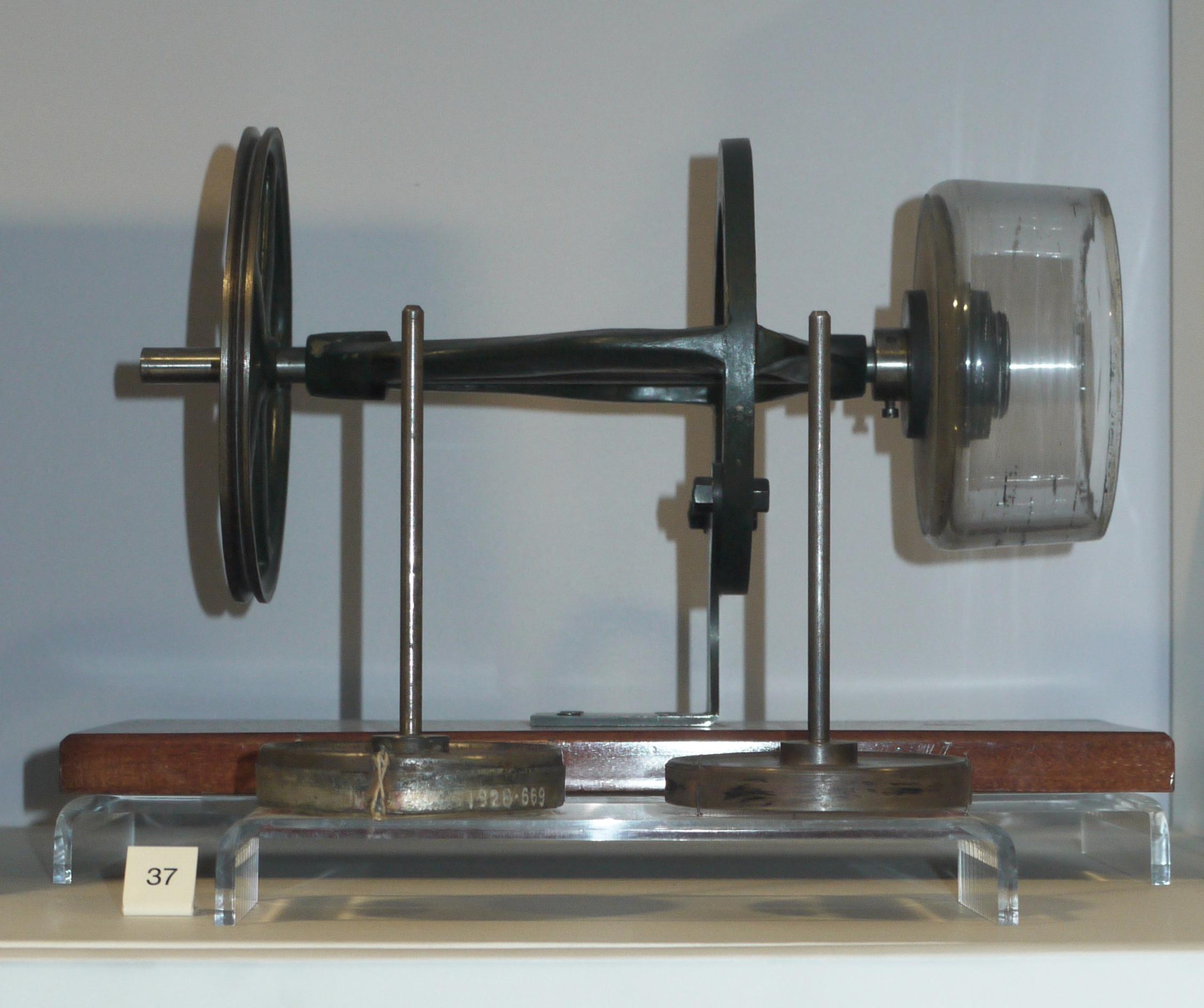
A device for spinning Viscose Rayon dating from 1901

About half of all fibres are synthetic, with applications in every field of fiber and textile technology. Although many classes of fibers based on synthetic polymers have been evaluated as potentially valuable commercial products, four of them - nylon, polyester, acrylic and polyolefin - dominate the market. These four account for approximately 98 percent by volume of synthetic fiber production, with polyester alone accounting for around 60 percent.

== Comparison with natural fibers ==
Over the years, global fiber production increased from about 57 million metric tons in 2000 to 111 million metric tons in 2020 and synthetic fibers have become the major materials in the textile industry.

Fibers are generally classified into three categories: natural, synthetic, and semi-synthetic. Natural fibers are obtained from natural resources such as plants, animals, and minerals. Common examples include cotton, wool, silk, and linen. In contrast, synthetic fibers are manufactured through chemical processes. Polyester, nylon, and spandex are among the most widely used types of synthetic fibers. Natural and synthetic fibers can also be blended to create fabrics that possess desirable qualities of both materials.

Natural and synthetic fibers differ in several properties, including biodegradability, moisture management, durability, and production cost. Natural fibers are generally more biodegradable than synthetic fibers which can persist in environments for hundreds of years. During their lifespan, all fabrics release mircofibers, although the rate and environmental effects depend on the material. Synthetic fibers release microfibers at a much higher rate than natural fibers and also release microplastics with the microfibers which damage soil, contaminate water, and harm wildlife.

Natural fibers generally absorb and release moisture more readily, whereas many synthetic fibers are usually water resistant and resistant to wrinkling. Both fiber types are very strong and durable but some natural fibers tend to shrink and wrinkle when exposed to heat or moisture. These traits combined with their relatively low production cost have contributed to the widespread use of synthetic fibers in the fashion industry. Producing synthetic fibers is less expensive than the cost of growing and harvesting natural fibers.

== Common uses ==
Synthetic fibers are used in a wide range of industries because their properties can be tailored for specific applications. In the textile industry, they are commonly used to manufacture clothing, upholstery, and linens because of their durability, resistance to wrinkling, and fading. Synthetic fibers are also used in household items such as carpets, rugs, and curtains. Additionally, their strength and durability make them suitable for ropes and cables.

In medical applications, bio-polyesters are used to manufacture implants, including surgical sutures, bone-fixation devices, vascular grafts, and drug-delivery devices. Antimicrobial fibers, which inhibit the growth of bacteria and fungi, are used in hospital gowns, wound-care materials, and sterile bandages.

Synthetic fibers are also used in high-performance textiles and technical applications, including transportation, agriculture, and construction. In transportation, synthetic fibers are used in materials that make up automobiles, trucks, ships, trains, aircraft, and spacecraft. Applications include airbags, safety belts, seat covers, tires, covers, and air filters. Their low weight, strength, and durability are advantages properties for transportation. In agriculture, synthetic fibers are used in erosion and crop protection, sunlight screening, wind shield packaging, and anti-bird netting. Concrete reinforcement, pipes, and heat insulation are a few examples of construction materials that are made from synthetic fibers.

== Environmental impact ==
Synthetic fibers release microplastics during the production, washing, and degrading of garments. Each laundry cycle involving synthetic garments can release up to 700,000 microplastic fibers. Once released, microplastics can enter the air, water, and soil, where they can be transferred through different environments, affecting organisms and ecosystems. Since microplastics are non-biodegradable, they may take 200 years or more to decompose, accumulating in the air, water, and soil and contributing to long-term pollution in environments. Natural fibers such as cotton are much more sustainable materials and can be used as alternatives to synthetic fibers to reduce microplastic pollution.

=== Carbon footprint ===
The production of synthetic fibers is associated with high greenhouse gas emissions. For instance, producing 1 kg of acrylic emits 35.7 kg of CO_{2} equivalents, nylon emits 32 kg, and polyester emits 27.2 kg. These emissions are significant compared to many natural fibers. Additionally, nylon production releases nitrous oxide, a greenhouse gas 310 times more potent than CO_{2}, making its impact especially severe. Acrylic, while praised for its softness, has a short garment lifespan and limited durability, leading to more frequent disposal and increased environmental burden.

== Common synthetic fibers ==
Common synthetic fibers include:

- Nylon (1931)
- Modacrylic (1949)
- Olefin (1949)
- Acrylic (1950)
- Polyester (1953)

Specialty synthetic fibers include:

- Rayon (1894) artificial silk
- Vinyon (1939)
- Saran (1941)
- Spandex (1959)
- Vinalon (1939)
- Aramids (1961) - known as Nomex, Kevlar and Twaron
- Modal (1960s)
- Dyneema/Spectra (1979)
- PBI (Polybenzimidazole fiber) (1983)
- Sulfar (1983)
- Lyocell (1992) (artificial, not synthetic)
- PLA (2002)
- M-5 (PIPD fiber)
- Orlon
- Zylon (PBO fiber)
- Vectran (TLCP fiber) made from Vectra LCP polymer
- Derclon used in manufacture of rugs

- Azlon

Other synthetic materials used in fibers include:

- Acrylonitrile rubber (1930)

Modern fibers that are made from older artificial materials include:

- Glass fiber (1938) is used for:
  - industrial, automotive, and home insulation (glass wool)
  - reinforcement of composite materials (glass-reinforced plastic, glass fiber reinforced concrete)
  - specialty papers in battery separators and filtration
- Metallic fiber (1946) is used for:
  - adding metallic properties to clothing for the purpose of fashion (usually made with composite plastic and metal foils)
  - elimination and prevention of static charge build-up
  - conducting electricity to transmit information
  - conduction of heat

== See also ==
- Artificial turf
- Elasterell
- Rope
- Delustrant
