= Fire-retardant fabric =

Flame retardant fabric

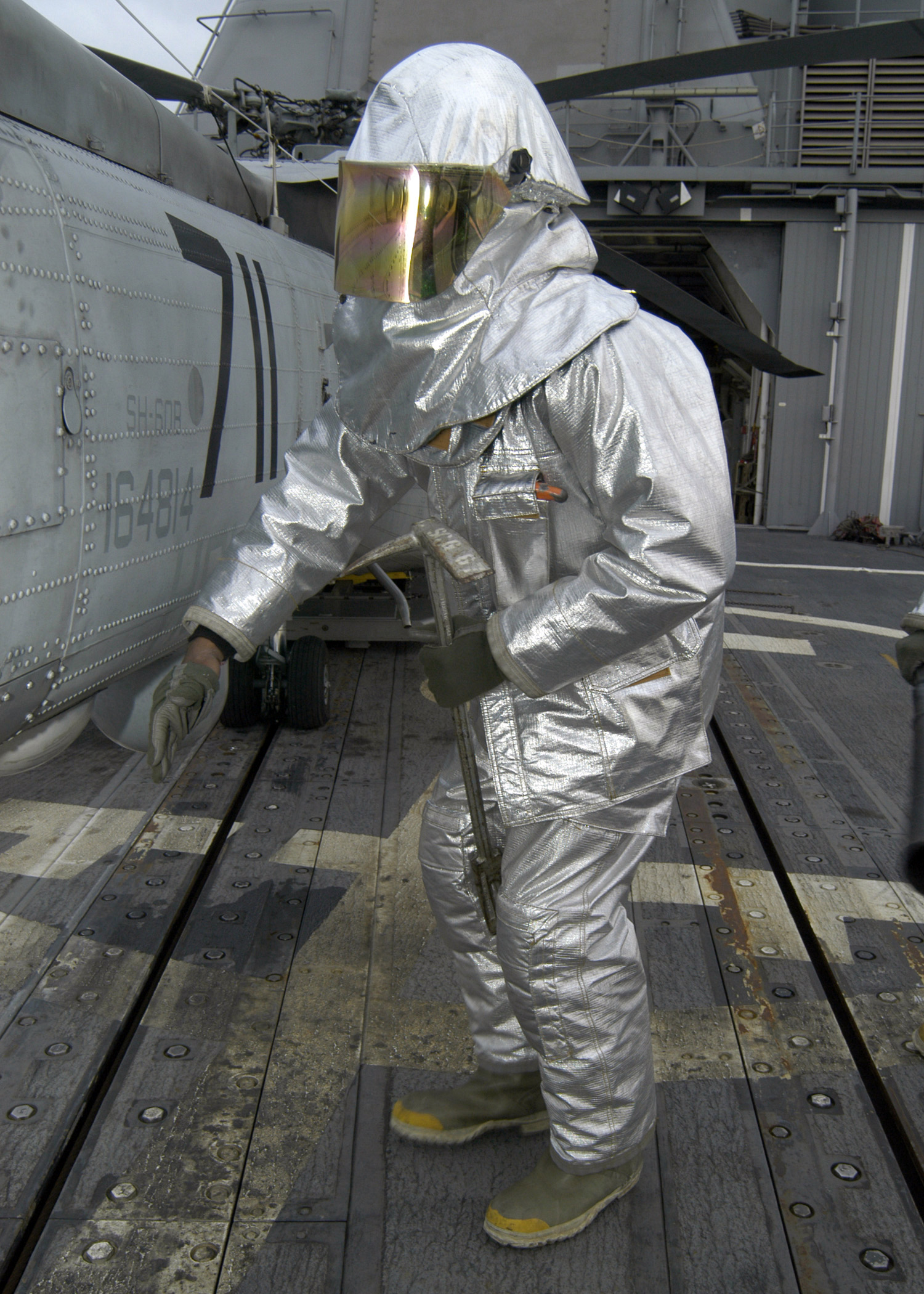
A sailor wearing a fire-retardant suit checks for hot spots during a crash and smash drill

Fire-retardant fabrics refer to the type of textiles that are designed to resist ignition and slow the spread of fire. Fabrics of this category are often considered for improved safety in many applications. They may either be inherently fire-retardant or treated with flame-retardant chemicals. Both options can provide protection against heat and flame damage.

They are used in a wide variety of areas that require the attributes of being retardant to flames, including protective clothing, curtains, household upholstery, and other industrial items. To ensure these fabrics maintain a quality of effectiveness, they must meet a very strict set of safety standards, such as NFPA 701 (North America) and EN 13501 (Europe). These standards can be maintained through the use of selective materials and specialized treatments that can reduce flammability greatly and delay combustion.

== Properties ==
The term fire retardant or flame retardant applies to a chemical substance that is or can be applied or treated to materials in order to prevent the start of or slow the growth of fire.

The tests used specified in building codes, such as NFPA 701, are more correctly flame resistance tests, which test a fabric's ability to resist ignition with the flame size and duration in the test conditions. The result is a comparative test, which provides a measure of the material's resistance to propagating combustion caused by small scale ignition sources. However, these tests do not predict the burning characteristics of full scale hazards. In many cases, if exposed to a sufficiently large and sustained exposure fire, the fire-retardant fabrics will burn vigorously.

Polyester is inherently flame retardant, and therefore doesn't flare up when applied to various tests. Any amount of heat delivered within a long enough time interval will have no impact on the fabrics' integrity while a limited amount of heat delivered within short enough time interval may ignite or melt the fabric.

== Curtains ==
Inherently flame-retardant fabrics are certified in the United Kingdom by various British Standards. Fire-retardant fabrics sold in the UK for use as curtains must abide by BS 5867 Part 2 B & C, a British Standard. Other relevant UK standards include BS 5815-1 2005, BS 7175, Crib 5, IMO A563 and NFPA 701. These are treated in chemicals to increase its ability to resist fire and combusting easily. Importantly, treated fabrics may lose their effectiveness of flame retardancy over time or if the curtains are exposed to outside conditions. Affected items could require retreatment or replacement.

== Stage drapery ==
Fabric flammability is an important textile issue, especially for stage drapery that will be used in a public space such as a school, theatre or special event venue. In the United States, Federal regulations require that drapery fabrics used in such spaces be certified as flame or fire-retardant. For draperies and other fabrics used in public places, this is known as the NFPA 701 Test, which follows standards developed by the National Fire Protection Association (NFPA). Although all fabrics will burn, some are naturally more resistant to fire than others. Those that are more flammable can have their fire resistance drastically improved by treatment with fire-retardant chemicals.

Inherently flame-retardant fabrics such as certain brand polyesters are commonly used for flame retardant curtain fabrics. Benefits of these fabrics help maintain the fire-resistant properties over time without the need to retreat the fabric. They are built to work as durable working fabrics that can be cleaned repeatedly and retain the properties that make it fire-resistant.

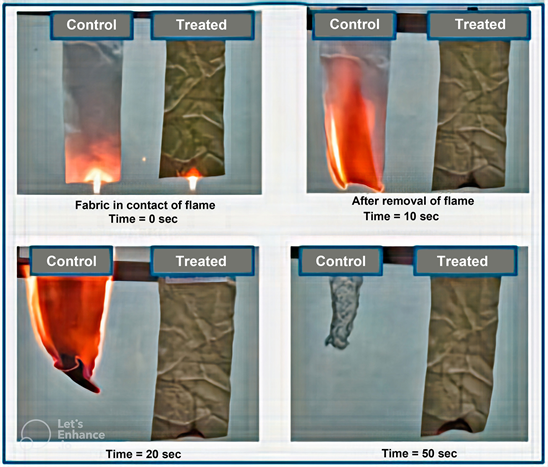
A comparison of the burning behavior of cotton fibers treated with Spinach Juice to untreated controls

== Fire-retardancy fabric treatment ==
Fire-retardant fabrics are normally treated to different British Standards; normally this depends on the end usage of the fabrics. The relevant standards for fire-retardant fabrics include:

- BS 5852:2006 describes the best practice methods to assess the ignitability of single material combinations, such as covers and fillings used in upholstered seating, or complete items of seating. These tests determine the effects of a smoldering cigarette, or other flaming ignition sources such as burning matches or a four-sheet full-size newspaper. This standard can be used to establish the potential ignitability of components in conjunction with other specified materials. BS 5852:2006 first looks at the criteria of ignition, and the health and safety of operators. It then explains the various apparatus, before focusing on smoldering ignition sources – such as a cigarette, butane gas flames and flaming wooden cribs. It also looks at ways to test for the ignitability of upholstery composites and complete items of furniture. The standard concludes with a final examination and test report. BS 5852:2006 replaces the older certification standard, BS 5852 - 1990.
- BS 5867 is for flame retardant fabrics. It relates to curtains, blinds and drapes for windows when tested by the methods specified in BS 5438:1976. Where appropriate, a cleansing or wetting procedure specified in BS 5651 may also be required.
- Source 5 (Crib 5) is related to upholstery and furniture coverings, and is related to BS 5852. The "crib 5 test" uses a small structure (or "crib") made from wooden sticks that are glued together. A lint pad is attached at the bottom and propane-diol is added when it is to be used in to test upholstery. In a test, the "crib" is ignited with a match. To decide whether the test has been passed or not the fabric cover/filling upholstery arrangement is assessed to see whether there is flaming or smoldering on both the outer cover and the interior filling material. Assuming it does not ignite or smolder, the upholstery arrangement will pass the test as "non-ignition". Similar tests include "Source 0" (smoldering cigarette) and "Source 1" (simulated match) tests.
- BS 476 is how a building will behave in a scenario where fire is involved and ensure that the building materials will not collapse but remain standing or keep the flames back for an amount of time. It dictates which tests are appropriate for the building structure and gives a graded level of fire resistance.

The M1 standard is a European standard that is widely used in Europe only. In construction, "M1" is part of a bigger classification system that France and Finland primarily use, but is used across the country. This relates to the reaction that materials have when ignited, i.e. insulation, wall panels, textiles, furniture, etc. The classification system has 5 levels from M0-Non-combustible, to M4-Easily flammable where the materials are tested for heat release, production of smoke, flame spread rate, and ignitability. UK fire officers are reluctant to accept M1 certification, as they prefer BS certificates due to the detail that the BS certifications go into, and lean more into legal, insurance, and safety measures in UK businesses.

== Durability and cleaning of fabric and drapes ==
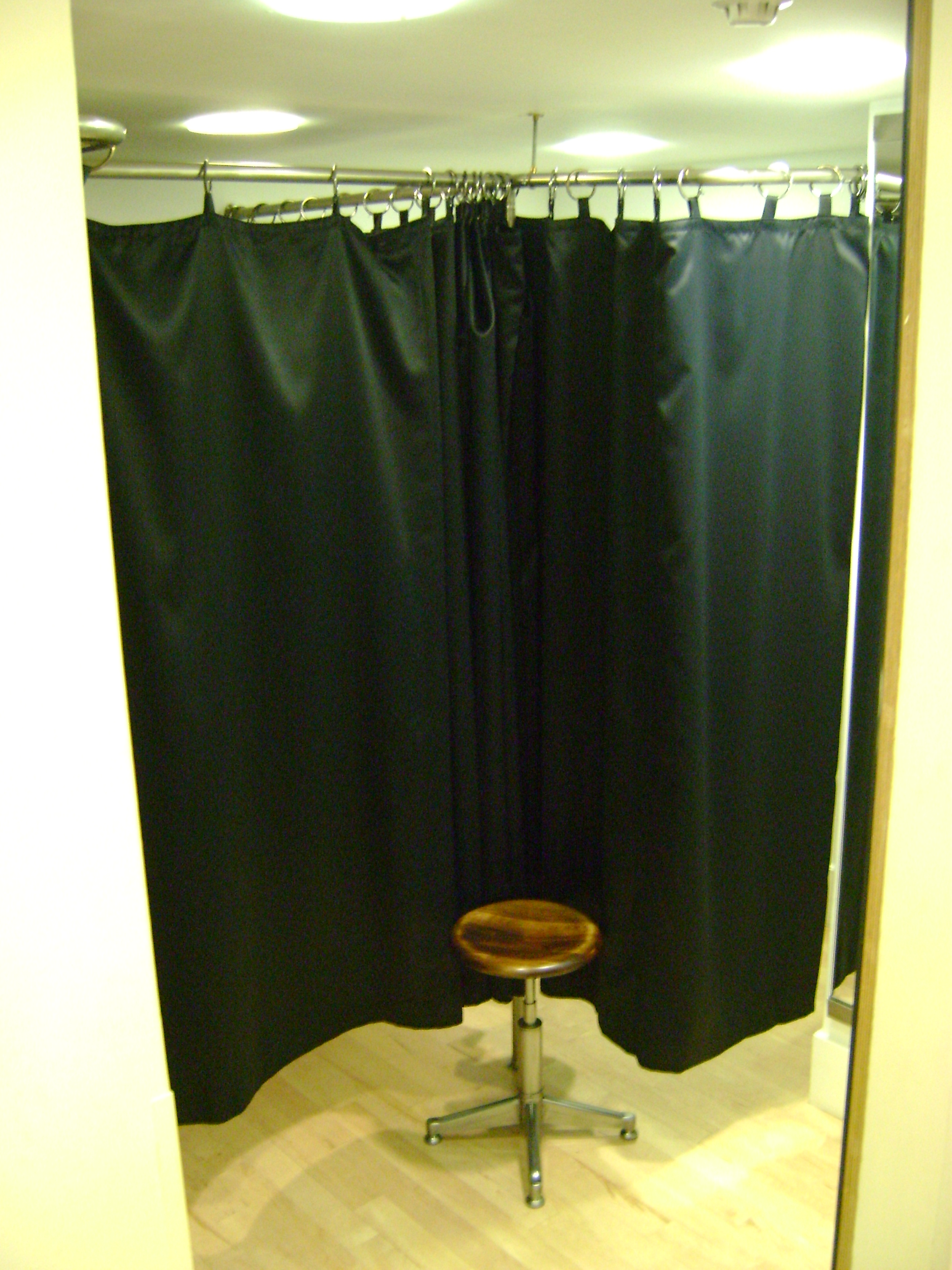
Flame retardant curtains

When a fabric is designated as inherently fire-retardant, permanently fire-retardant, or durably fire-retardant, the flame retardancy will last for the life of the fabric as it has been woven into the fabric fiber itself. The drapery can be laundered or dry-cleaned as recommended by the drapery manufacturer. In the case of fabrics that are designated as fire-retardant, and that have been topically treated with chemicals, the flame retardancy of the fabric will dissipate over time, particularly with repeated cleaning. As these chemicals are soluble in liquids, either water or dry cleaning fluid, these fabrics must be dry-cleaned with a non-liquid cleaning agent. The flame retardants work by coating the flammable fabrics with a mineral based barrier, preventing fire from reaching the fibers.

Typically, the flame retardancy of topically treated fabric is certified for one year, though the actual length of time in which the treatment remains effective will vary based on the number of times the drapery is dry-cleaned and the environmental conditions in the location in which the drapery is used. It is recommended that topically treated drapery be re-tested for fire-retardancy on an annual basis and re-treated by a qualified professional as needed.

== See also ==
- Marko (fabric)
- BSI Group
- Marlan (fabric)
- Technical textile
- Polybenzimidazole Fiber
