= Elasterell =

Elasterell (officially "elasterell-p") is an alternative to the generic term "polyester" for a specific subgroup of inherently elastic, multicomponent textile fibers.

The Federal Trade Commission (FTC) in November 2002 issued a final rule which establishes the name. Elasterell was originally manufactured by E.I. du Pont de Nemours and Company and previously referred to as "T400". The FTC states that because this material is arguably comparable to other multicomponent polyester fibers, other companies that manufacture fibers satisfying the definition of "elasterell-p" may use that name in making required fiber content disclosures on labels.

The FTC defines "elasterell-p" as fiber formed by the interaction of two or more chemically distinct polymers (of which none exceeds 85% by weight) which contain ester groups as the dominant functional unit (at least 85% by weight of the total polymer content of the fiber) and which, if stretched at least 100%, durably and rapidly reverts substantially to its unstretched length when the tension is removed.
