= Vinyon =

Synthetic fiber made from PVC

Vinyon is a generic term for synthetic fiber made primarily from polyvinyl chloride. Vinyon fibers may also be called to as polyvinyl chloride fibers, especially outside the United States. It can bind non-woven fibers and fabrics. Its existence was known as early as 1937, and 1939 by the American Viscose Corporation had begun manufacturing a copolymer textile fiber made from vinyl chloride and vinyl acetate.

It has the same health problems associated with chlorinated polymers. In the past, Vinyon was used a substitute for plant-based filters in tea bags.

== Vinyon fiber characteristics ==
As vinyon fiber is a generic term for copolymerized PVC fibers, properties will differ among different formulations. For modern vinyon fibers, the United States Federal Trade Commission sets its definition as a copolymer containing at least 85% vinyl chloride by mass. Several sources note the fiber type for low melting points, thermoplastic behavior, and resistance to acids/bases and other chemicals though these are properties that will vary with specific fiber type.

== History ==
=== Original fiber ===
In a 1940 description of vinyon, its structure was described as a linear copolymer of vinyl chloride and vinyl acetate with "high-molecular-weight" that could be stretched create yarns for textiles. It was noted that vinyl acetate acted as a plasticizer for the copolymer, preventing a need for small-molecule plasticizers in the final product. The polymer is soluble in acetone and could be spun into a fiber from solution.

As a thermoplastic material, vinyon could be used as a "staple" material in producing felts to bind other fiber types. As a chloride-containing polymer, it has a tendency to smoke and char rather than catch fire which made it useful for fire resistance when it was invented. Vinyon was noted for its resistance to caustic aqueous solutions, both acid and base, and was primarily used for industrial filtration shortly after its initial invention. It deteriorated more slowly in saltwater than other textile materials available at the time and thus found use in fishing nets.

=== Vinyon N ===
Vinyon N was developed by the Carbide and Carbon Chemicals Corporation to improve the properties of the original vinyl chloride-vinyl acetate copolymer. The invention was announced in 1947 and pilot production began in 1948.

The new copolymer used acrylonitrile in place of vinyl acetate. In the original formulation, vinyl chloride only formed 56-60 % of the polymer and would not be considered vinyon by later FTC definitions. Vinyon N fibers had a higher softening point than the original vinyl acetate based copolymers, and the manufacturer claimed superior resistance to solvent for Vinyon N. Staple fibers of vinyon N were commercialized in 1949 under the trademark Dynel and had begun to supersede the vinyl acetate copolymer by 1951. However, vinyon N was also more difficult to dye than the original vinyon making it difficult to use for textiles.

== Uses ==
With a relatively low softening and melting point, vinyon found use as a bonding agent for non-woven fabrics and products.

In 1952, the use of vinyon N as a graft for arterial defects was explored by Arthur Voorhees. This early work has been cited as an important development in the field of synthetic arterial grafts, though vinyon N was replaced by improved synthetic polymers with time.

== See also ==
- Textile
