= Olefin fiber =

Synthetic fiber made from a polyolefin

Olefin fiber is a synthetic fiber made from a polyolefin, such as polypropylene or polyethylene. It is used in wallpaper, carpeting, ropes, and vehicle interiors.

Olefin's advantages are its strength, colorfastness and comfort, its resistance to staining, mildew, abrasion, and sunlight, and its good bulk and cover.

== History ==
Italy began production of olefin fibers in 1957. The chemist Giulio Natta successfully formulated olefin suitable for more textile applications. Both Natta and Karl Ziegler were later awarded the Nobel Prize for their work on transition metal catalysis of olefins to fiber, also known as Ziegler–Natta catalysis. Production of olefin fibers in the U.S. began in 1960. Olefin fibers account for 16% of all manufactured fibers.

== Major fiber properties ==
Olefin fibers have great bulk and cover while having low specific gravity. This means “Warmth without the weight.” The fibers have low moisture absorption, but they can wick moisture and dry quickly. Olefin is abrasion, stain, sunlight, fire, and chemical resistant. It does not dye well, but has the advantage of being colorfast. Since Olefin has a low melting point, textiles can be thermally bonded. The fibers have the lowest static of all manufactured fibers and a medium luster. One of the most important properties of olefin is its strength. It keeps its strength in wet or dry conditions and is very resilient. The fiber can be produced for strength of different properties.

== Production method ==
The Federal Trade Commission's official definition of olefin fiber is “A manufactured fiber in which the fiber forming substance is any long-chain synthetic polymer composed of at least 85% by weight of ethylene, propylene, or other olefin units”

Polymerization of propylene and ethylene gases, controlled with special catalysts, creates olefin fibers. Dye is added directly to the polymer before melt spinning is applied. Additives, polymer variations and different process conditions can create a range of characteristics.

High pressure production, which uses ten tons per square inch, creates a film for molded materials. Low pressure production uses a low temperature with a catalyst and hydrocarbon solvent. This process is less expensive and produces a polyethylene polymer more for textile use.

The polymer is then melted, spun, by a spinneret into water, or air cooled. The fiber is drawn out to six times the spun length. Gel spinning is a new method in which a gel form of polyethylene polymers is used.

== Physical and chemical structure ==
=== Physical ===
Olefin fibers can be multi- or monofilament and staple, tow, or film yarns. The fibers are colorless and round in cross section. This cross section can be modified for different end uses. The physical characteristics are a waxy feel and colorless.

=== Chemical ===
There are two types of polymers that can be used in olefin fibers. The first, polyethylene, is a simple linear structure with repeating units. These fibers are used mainly for ropes, twines and utility fabrics.

The second type, polypropylene, is a three-dimensional structure with a backbone of carbon atoms. Methyl groups protrude from this backbone. Stereoselective polymerization orders these methyl groups to the same spatial placement. This creates a crystalline polypropylene polymer. The fibers made with these polymers can be used in apparel, furnishing and industrial products.

== Manufacturers ==
The first commercial producer of an olefin fiber in the United States was Hercules, Inc. (FiberVisions). Other U.S. olefin fiber producers include Asota; American Fibers and Yarns Co; American Synthetic Fiber, LLC; Color-Fi; FiberVisions; Foss Manufacturing Co., LLC; Drake Extrusion; Filament Fiber Technology, Inc.; TenCate Geosynthetics; Universal Fiber Systems LLC.

== Trademarks according to fabric use ==
Producer – Allied-Signal

- A.C.E. – Tire cord, furniture webbing

Producer – DuPont

- CoolMax – Warm-weather and action wear
- Hollofil, Quallofil – Fiberfill and insulating fibers
- Sontara – Spunlaced nonwoven fabrics
- Thermostat – Cold-weather wear
- Thermoloft – Fiberfill and insulating fibers
- Tyvek – Used for house wraps to postal envelopes to clothing

Producer – Trevira

- ESP – Apparel and furnishings
- Celwet – Nonwovens
- Comfort Fiber – Staple fiber for apparel uses
- Floor Guardian – Gym Floor Carpet Protection System
- Loftguard – Staple fiber for industrial uses
- Polar Guard
- Lambda – Filament yarns with spun-yarn characteristics
- Serene
- Superba
- Trevira HT – Marine and military uses; ropes, cordages
- Trevira ProEarth – Recycled-content geotextiles
- Trevira XPS – Carpeting
- BTU – Cold-weather apparel

Producer – 3M

- Thinsulate – Cold-weather action wear

== Uses ==
=== Apparel ===
Sports & active wear, socks, hoodies, thermal underwear; lining fabrics.

=== Home furnishing ===
Olefin can be used by itself or in blends for indoor and outdoor carpets, carpet tiles, and carpet backing. The fiber can also be used in indoor upholstery, draperies, wall coverings, slipcovers, and floor coverings. It is often used in basements due to its quick-drying and mold-resistant properties. Olefin fabric is frequently used for outdoor furniture due to its impressive weather resistance and durability performance statistics.

=== Automotive ===
Olefin can be used for interior fabrics, sun visors, arm rests, door and side panels, trunks, parcel shelves, and resin replacement as binder fibers.

=== Industrial ===
In an industrial setting, olefin creates carpets; ropes, geo-textiles that are in contact with the soil, filter fabrics, bagging, concrete reinforcement, and heat-sealable paper (e.g. tea- and coffee-bags).

== Care procedures ==
When dry-cleaned, many dry-cleaning solvents can swell Olefin fibers. Since Olefin dries quickly, line drying and low tumble drying with little or no heat is recommended. Since Olefin is not absorbent, waterborne stains do not present a problem. However, oily stains are difficult to remove, though lukewarm water, detergent, and bleach can be used to remove such stains. Olefin fiber has a low melting point (around 225 to 335 °F (107 to 168 °C), depending on the polymer's grade) so care must be taken to iron these at a low temperature, as to prevent melting. Items such as outdoor carpets and other fabrics can be hosed off. Olefin is easy to recycle.

== See also ==
- Alkene
- Elastolefin
