= Hydroentanglement =

Bonding process for wet or dry fibrous webs

Hydroentanglement is a bonding process for wet or dry fibrous webs made by either carding, airlaying or wet-laying, the resulting bonded fabric being a nonwoven. It uses fine, high pressure jets of water which penetrate the web, hit the conveyor belt (or "wire" as in papermaking conveyor) and bounce back causing the fibres to entangle.

Hydroentanglement is sometimes known as spunlacing, this term arising because the early nonwovens were entangled on conveyors with a patterned weave which gave the nonwovens a lacy appearance. It can also be regarded as a two-dimensional equivalent of spinning fibres into yarns prior to weaving. The water pressure has a direct bearing on the gsm, and strength of the web, and very high pressures not only entangle but can also split fibres into micro- and nano-fibres which give the resulting hydroentangled nonwoven a leatherlike or even silky texture. This type of nonwoven can be as strong and tough as woven fabrics made from the same fibres.

== Composition ==
Different types of staple length fibers and blends can be used in hydroentangled nonwoven fabrics. Polyester and cellulosic (regenerated cellulosic fibers such as viscose) blend is most commonly used in these fabrics.

== Characteristics ==
The spun-lace fabrics have variable thickness and properties since they are produced by varying processing parameters such as waterjet pressure, delivery speed, web mass and web composition. Primarily these fabrics are water absorbent and holds many other properties like water retention, water vapor permeability and capillary. They are lightweight, soft, flexible and silky texture. They are disposable and affordable than peers.

== Process ==
The spunlace nonwoven manufacturing process includes the following key steps:spunlace nonwoven process Retrieved 21 January 2016.

Fiber Preparation
Selection of raw materials which can be natural fibers like cotton, viscose, bamboo, or synthetic fibers such as polyester and polypropylene, individually or in blends.

Carding
Fibers are separated and aligned in parallel by passing through rollers with fine wire teeth to prepare for web formation.

Web Formation
The aligned fibers are formed into a loose, fibrous web that serves as the base material for the spunlace process.

Hydroentangling (Spunlacing)
The loose fiber web is passed through high-pressure water jets that spray water jets onto the fibers, entangling them mechanically into a durable fabric.

Dewatering and Drying
Excess water is removed from the fabric using mechanical rollers and/or hot air drying to prepare the fabric for finishing and winding.

== Use ==
They are suitable for many types of wet wipes, kitchen wipes and aprons. By altering physical properties with lamination, coating, etc. these fabrics offer variety of products suitable in use of hygiene care and medical textiles for instance sanitary napkins, baby wipes, face masks and range of medical gowns used as a part of PPE.
