= Marko (fabric) =

Type of fabric

Marko (UNE EN 11612) is a registered trademark for a group of flame retardant fabrics used in the manufacture of protective clothing for industrial sectors. It was developed in 1997 and marketed as a mark of quality protection. The fabric is a combination of modacrylic and cotton fibres.

== Properties ==
Marko represents a multi-standard fabric for which its creators claim properties that persist throughout a garment's life. The fabric offers remains comfortable and displays no significant wear following washes in both laundry and domestic settings. Protective clothing that complies with EN 11612 is designed to protect industrial workers from brief contact with flames and at least one type of heat. Heat contact may take the form of convective, radiant or contact heat, an electric arc, splashes of molten metal, or certain combinations of these types.

Marko fabrics must also comply with other standards and are therefore tested for tear resistance, tear strength, burst strength and seam strength.

== Types ==
The Marko trademark was later applied to new designs that were developed to address specific risks in the workplace. These include:

- Marko Steel (an iron and steel molten metal splash repellant that is appropriate for heavy metal and foundry industries)
- Marko AT180HV (high-visibility that is used for work in high altitude areas)
- Arc Electric Protection EN61482-1-2, Class 1 and Class 2 (combined)
- EN471 knitted light and heavy constructions for high-visibility

== See also ==
- Marlan (fabric), another flame retardant fabric from Marina Textil
