= Marlan (fabric) =

Marlan is a registered trademark of a permanently flame retardant fabric (certified according to the UNE EN 11612) used for protective clothing for workers in foundries.

It was developed in 1997 and has been marketed by Marina Textil since 1998, designed to protect against splashes of molten metal splashes including aluminium, cryolite, iron, steel, copper, magnesium, glass and others.

Its compositions is a blend of fibers, primarily featuring wool and FR flame retardant cellulose fiber.

== Properties and development ==
Marlan's protective factor does not decrease after washing, and its properties remain unchanged throughout the entire useful life of the fabric. The special characteristics of its natural fibers provide it with inherent protective and comfort properties.

According to the EN ISO 9185 standard, it achieves the highest D3 protection level against molten aluminum splashes and E3 level against molten iron splashes.

The wool, as the main fiber in its composition, offers thermal insulation and prevents molten metal from sticking to the fabric—a common issue with other fibers previously used in the sector (such as cotton, polyamides, or aramids). One of Marlan’s key advantages is its protective capability against cryolite, a flux used in primary aluminum production.

== Types of Marlan ==
These are currently different types and evolutions of Marlan, developed to cover specific risk in foundries:

- Marlan AL600R and Marlan AL400R (EN ISO 6942), aluminized fabric for protection against radiant heat.
- Marlan Plus an enhanced version of Marlan, offering greater comfort.
- Marlan HV and Marlan Plus HV (EN 20471) High visibility fabrics to improve worker detectability.
- Marlan SX (EN 11612) with ceramic finish, provides protection against strong impacts from molten metal.

== Marina Textil ==
Marina Textil is the manufacturer of Marlan. Founded in 1996 in Barberà del Vallès, Barcelona, the company specializes in the development and production of technical fabrics for personal protective clothing in industrial environments.

The company develops fabrics that are flame-retardant, antistatic, high-visibility, and 'chemical-resistant. Marina Textil actively collaborates with technological centers and universities to innovate in occupational protection solutions. Its products are exported internationally and comply with major European and American safety standards.

== See also ==
- Marko (fabric), another flame retardant fabric from Marina Textil
