= Fiber =

Natural or synthetic substance that is significantly longer than it is wide

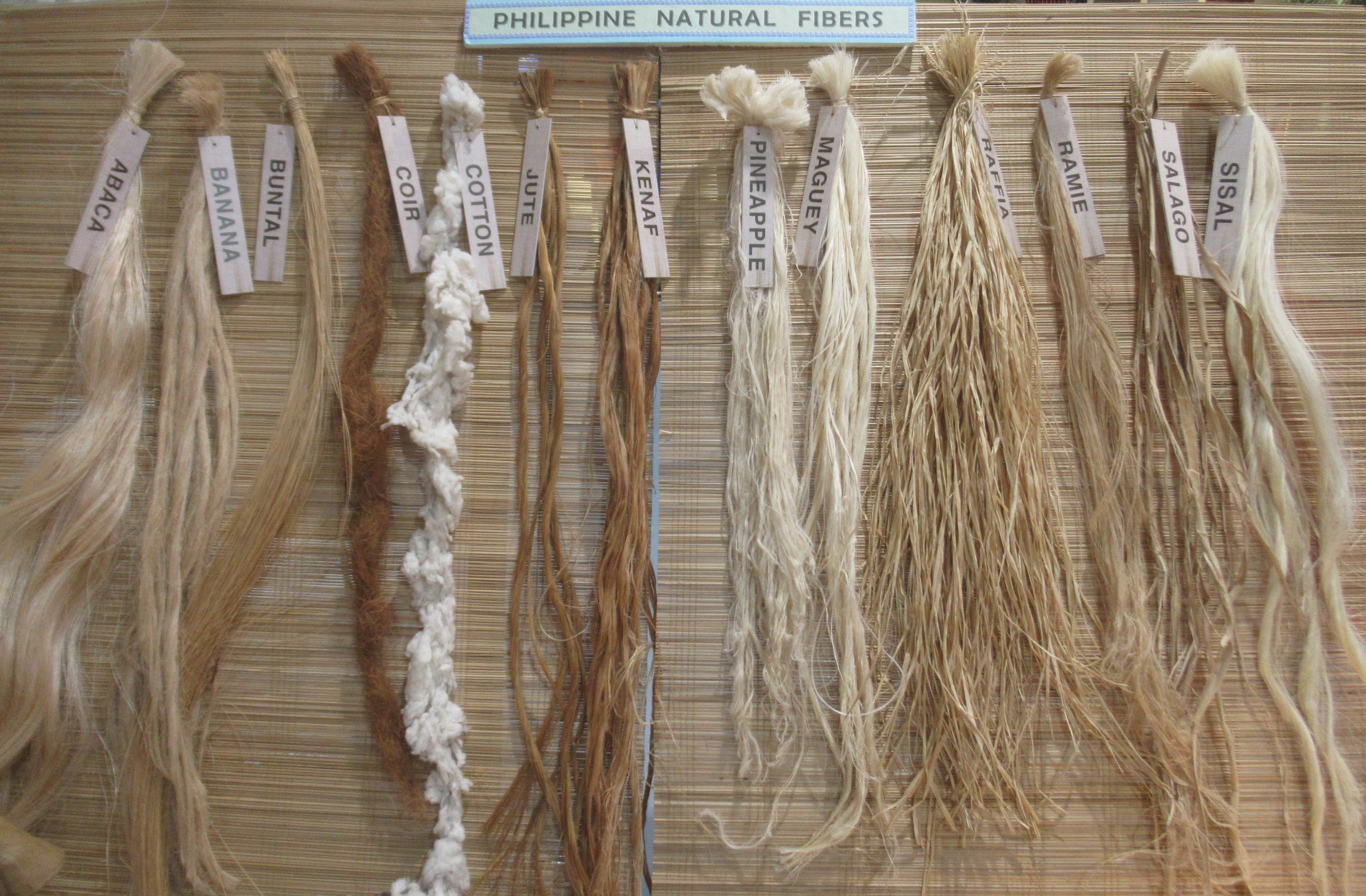
Various natural fibers from plants found in the Philippines. Labels show the plant names

Fiber (spelled fibre in British English; from Latin: fibra) is a natural or artificial substance that is significantly longer than it is wide. Fibers are often used in the manufacture of other materials. The strongest engineering materials often incorporate fibers, for example carbon fiber and ultra-high-molecular-weight polyethylene.

Synthetic fibers can often be produced very cheaply and in large amounts compared to natural fibers, but for clothing natural fibers have some benefits, such as comfort, over their synthetic counterparts.

== Natural fibers ==
Natural fibers develop or occur in the fiber shape, and include those produced by plants, animals, and geological processes. They can be classified according to their origin:

- Vegetable fibers are generally based on arrangements of cellulose, often with lignin: examples include cotton, hemp, jute, flax, abaca, piña, ramie, sisal, bagasse, and banana. Plant fibers are employed in the manufacture of paper and textile (cloth), and dietary fiber is an important component of human nutrition.
- Wood fiber, distinguished from vegetable fiber, is from tree sources. Forms include groundwood, lacebark, thermomechanical pulp (TMP), and bleached or unbleached kraft or sulfite pulps. Kraft and sulfite refer to the type of pulping process used to remove the lignin bonding the original wood structure, thus freeing the fibers for use in paper and engineered wood products such as fiberboard.
- Animal fibers consist largely of particular proteins. Instances are silkworm silk, spider silk, sinew, catgut, wool, sea silk and hair such as cashmere wool, mohair and angora, fur such as sheepskin, rabbit, mink, fox, beaver, etc.
- Mineral fibers include the asbestos group. Asbestos is the only naturally occurring long mineral fiber. Six minerals have been classified as "asbestos" including chrysotile of the serpentine class and those belonging to the amphibole class: amosite, crocidolite, tremolite, anthophyllite and actinolite. Short, fiber-like minerals include wollastonite and palygorskite.
- Biological fibers, also known as fibrous proteins or protein filaments, consist largely of biologically relevant and biologically very important proteins, in which mutations or other genetic defects can lead to severe diseases. Instances include the collagen family of proteins, tendons, muscle proteins like actin, and many others, such as spider silk, and hair.

== Artificial fibers ==
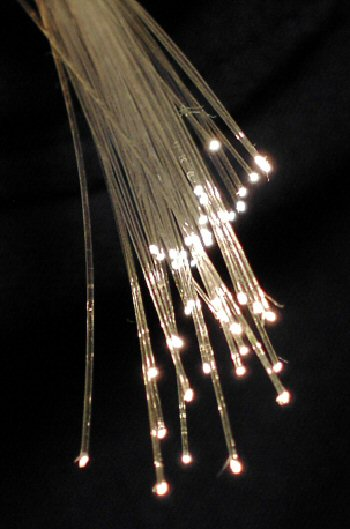
A bundle of optical fibers

Artificial or chemical fibers are fibers whose chemical composition, structure, and properties are significantly modified during the manufacturing process. In fashion, a fiber is a long and thin strand or thread of material that can be knit or woven into a fabric. Artificial fibers consist of regenerated fibers and synthetic fibers.

=== Semi-synthetic fibers ===
Semi-synthetic fibers are made from raw materials with naturally long-chain polymer structure and are only modified and partially degraded by chemical processes, in contrast to completely synthetic fibers such as nylon (polyamide) or dacron (polyester), which the chemist synthesizes from low-molecular weight compounds by polymerization (chain-building) reactions. The earliest semi-synthetic fiber is the cellulose regenerated fiber, rayon. Most semi-synthetic fibers are cellulose regenerated fibers.

==== Cellulose regenerated fibers ====
Cellulose fibers are a subset of artificial fibers, regenerated from natural cellulose. The cellulose comes from various sources: rayon from tree wood fiber, bamboo fiber from bamboo, seacell from seaweed, etc. In the production of these fibers, the cellulose is reduced to a fairly pure form as a viscous mass and formed into fibers by extrusion through spinnerets. Therefore, the manufacturing process leaves few characteristics distinctive of the natural source material in the finished products.

Some examples of this fiber type are:

- rayon
- Lyocell, a brand of rayon
- Modal
- diacetate fiber
- triacetate fiber.

Historically, cellulose diacetate and -triacetate were classified under the term rayon, but are now considered distinct materials.

=== Synthetic fibers ===
Synthetic come entirely from synthetic materials such as petrochemicals, unlike those artificial fibers derived from such natural substances as cellulose or protein.

Fiber classification in reinforced plastics falls into two classes: (i) short fibers, also known as discontinuous fibers, with a general aspect ratio (defined as the ratio of fiber length to diameter) between 20 and 60, and (ii) long fibers, also known as continuous fibers, the general aspect ratio is between 200 and 500.

==== Metallic fibers ====
Metallic fibers can be drawn from ductile metals such as copper, gold or silver and extruded or deposited from more brittle ones, such as nickel, aluminum or iron.

==== Carbon fiber ====
Carbon fibers are often based on oxidized and via pyrolysis carbonized polymers like PAN, but the end product is almost pure carbon.

==== Silicon carbide fiber ====
Silicon carbide fibers, where the basic polymers are not hydrocarbons but polymers, where about 50% of the carbon atoms are replaced by silicon atoms, so-called poly-carbo-silanes. The pyrolysis yields an amorphous silicon carbide, including mostly other elements like oxygen, titanium, or aluminium, but with mechanical properties very similar to those of carbon fibers.

==== Fiberglass ====
Fiberglass, made from specific glass, and optical fiber, made from purified natural quartz, are also artificial fibers that come from natural raw materials, silica fiber, made from sodium silicate (water glass) and basalt fiber made from melted basalt.

==== Mineral fibers ====
Mineral fibers can be particularly strong because they are formed with a low number of surface defects; asbestos is a common one.

==== Polymer fibers ====
- Polymer fibers are a subset of artificial fibers, which are based on synthetic chemicals (often from petrochemical sources) rather than arising from natural materials by a purely physical process. These fibers are made from:
  - polyamide nylon
  - PET or PBT polyester
  - phenol-formaldehyde (PF)
  - polyvinyl chloride fiber (PVC) vinyon
  - polyolefins (PP and PE) olefin fiber
  - acrylic polyesters, pure polyester PAN fibers are used to make carbon fiber by roasting them in a low oxygen environment. Traditional acrylic fiber is used more often as a synthetic replacement for wool. Carbon fibers and PF fibers are noted as two resin-based fibers that are not thermoplastic, most others can be melted.
  - aromatic polyamids (aramids) such as Twaron, Kevlar and Nomex thermally degrade at high temperatures and do not melt. These fibers have strong bonding between polymer chains
  - polyethylene (PE), eventually with extremely long chains / HMPE (e.g. Dyneema or Spectra).
  - Elastomers can even be used, e.g. spandex although urethane fibers are starting to replace spandex technology.
  - polyurethane fiber
  - Elastolefin
- Coextruded fibers have two distinct polymers forming the fiber, usually as a core-sheath or side by side. Coated fibers exist such as nickel-coated to provide static elimination, silver-coated to provide anti-bacterial properties and aluminum-coated to provide RF deflection for radar chaff. Radar chaff is actually a spool of continuous glass tow that has been aluminum coated. An aircraft-mounted high speed cutter chops it up as it spews from a moving aircraft to confuse radar signals.

==== Microfibers ====
Invented in Japan in the early 1980s, microfibers are also known as microdenier fibers. Acrylic, nylon, polyester, lyocell and rayon can be produced as microfibers. In 1986, Hoechst A.G. of Germany produced microfiber in Europe. This fiber made it way into the United States in 1990 by DuPont.

Microfibers in textiles refer to sub-denier fiber (such as polyester drawn to 0.5 denier). Denier and Dtex are two measurements of fiber yield based on weight and length. If the fiber density is known, you also have a fiber diameter, otherwise it is simpler to measure diameters in micrometers. Microfibers in technical fibers refer to ultra-fine fibers (glass or meltblown thermoplastics) often used in filtration. Newer fiber designs include extruding fiber that splits into multiple finer fibers. Most synthetic fibers are round in cross-section, but special designs can be hollow, oval, star-shaped or trilobal. The latter design provides more optically reflective properties. Synthetic textile fibers are often crimped to provide bulk in a woven, non woven or knitted structure. Fiber surfaces can also be dull or bright. Dull surfaces reflect more light while bright tends to transmit light and make the fiber more transparent.

Very short and/or irregular fibers have been called fibrils. Natural cellulose, such as cotton or bleached kraft, show smaller fibrils jutting out and away from the main fiber structure.

== Typical properties of selected fibers ==
Fibers can be divided into natural and artificial (synthetic) substances, their properties can affect their performance in many applications. Synthetic fiber materials are increasingly replacing other conventional materials like glass and wood in a number of applications. This is because artificial fibers can be engineered chemically, physically, and mechanically to suit particular technical engineering. In choosing a fiber type, a manufacturer would balance their properties with the technical requirements of the applications. Various fibers are available to select for manufacturing. Here are typical properties of the sample natural fibers as compared to the properties of artificial fibers.

Table 1. Typical Properties of Selected Natural Fibers
Fiber type	Fiber Diameter (in)	Specific Gravity	Tensile Strength (Ksi)	Elastic Modulus (Ksi)	Elongation at Break (%)	Water Absorption (%)
Wood Fiber (Kraft Pulp)	0.001–0.003	1.5	51–290	1500–5800	N/A	50–75
Musamba	N/A	N/A	12	130	9.7	N/A
Coconut	0.004–0.016	1.12–1.15	17.4–29	2750–3770	10–25	130–180
Sisal	0.008–0.016	1.45	40–82.4	1880–3770	3–5	60–70
Sugar Cane Bagasse	0.008–0.016	1.2–1.3	26.7–42	2175–2750	1.1	70–75
Bamboo	0.002–0.016	1.5	50.8–72.5	4780–5800	N/A	40–45
Jute	0.004–0.008	1.02–1.04	36.3–50.8	3770–4640	1.5–1.9	28.64
Elephant grass	0.003–0.016	0.818	25.8	710	3.6	N/Ab
a Adapted from ACI 544. IR-96 P58, reference [12] P240 and [13] b N/A means properties not readily available or not applicable

Table 2. Properties of Selected Artificial Fibers
Fiber type	Fiber Diameter (0.001 in)	Specific Gravity	Tensile Strength (Ksi)	Elasticity Modulus (Ksi)	Elongation at Break (%)	Water Absorption (%)	Melting Point (°C)	Maximum Working Temp (°C)
Steel	4–40	7.8	70–380	30,000	0.5–3.5	nil	1370	760
Glass	0.3–0.8	2.5	220–580	10,400–11,600	2–4	N/A	1300	1000
Carbon	0.3–0.35	0.90	260–380	33,400–55,100	0.5–1.5	nil	3652–3697	N/A
Nylon	0.9	1.14	140	750	20–30	2.8–5.0	220–265	199
Acrylics	0.2–0.7	1.14–1.18	39–145	2,500–2,800	20–40	1.0–2.5	Decomp	180
Aramid	0.4–0.5	1.38–1.45	300–450	9,000–17,000	2–12	1.2–4.3	Decomp	450
Polyester	0.4–3.0	1.38	40–170	2,500	8–30	0.4	260	170
Polypropylene	0.8–8.0	0.9	65–100	500–750	10–20	nil	165	100
Polyethylene Low High	1.0-40.0	0.92 0.95	11–17 50–71	725	25–50 20–30	nil nil	110 135	55 65
a Adapted from ACI 544. IR-96 P40, reference [12] P240, [11] P209 and [13] b N/A means properties not readily available or not applicable

The tables above just show typical properties of fibers, in fact there are more properties which could be referred as follows (from a to z):

Arc Resistance, Biodegradable, Coefficient of Linear Thermal Expansion, Continuous Service Temperature, Density of Plastics, Ductile / Brittle Transition Temperature, Elongation at Break, Elongation at Yield, Fire Resistance, Flexibility, Gamma Radiation Resistance, Gloss, Glass Transition Temperature, Hardness, Heat Deflection Temperature, Shrinkage, Stiffness, Ultimate tensile strength, Thermal Insulation, Toughness, Transparency, UV Light Resistance, Volume Resistivity, Water absorption, Young's Modulus

== See also ==
- Ceramic matrix composite
- Dietary fiber
- Fiber crop
- Fiber simulation
- Fibers in Differential Geometry
- Molded pulp
- Axon – A nerve fiber
- Optical fiber
