= Nonwoven fabric =

Sheet of fibers

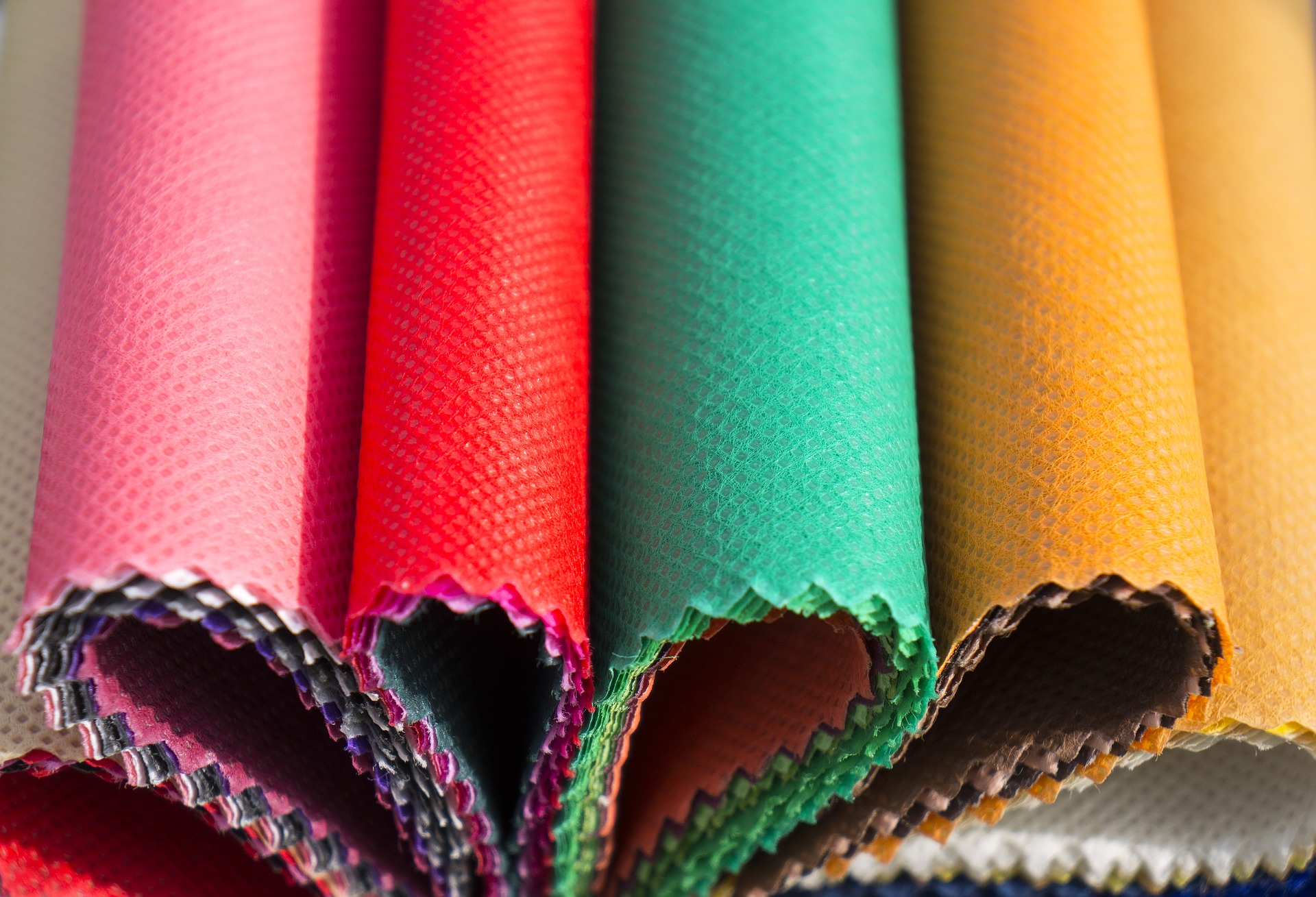
Multiple colored swatches of non-woven fabric

Nonwoven fabric or non-woven fabric is material made from staple (short) and long fibres (continuous long), bonded together by chemical, mechanical, heat or solvent treatment. The term is used in the textile manufacturing industry to denote fabrics, such as felt, which are neither woven nor knitted. Some non-woven materials lack sufficient strength unless densified or reinforced by a backing. In recent years, non-wovens have become an alternative to polyurethane foam.

== Applications ==
Because nonwoven fabrics do not require the intermediate step of converting fibres to yarn, they have more flexibility in materials usage. Nonwoven fabrics may be single-use, have a limited life, or be very durable. Nonwoven fabrics are sometimes designed to provide specific functions such as absorbency, liquid repellence, resilience, stretch, softness, strength, flame retardancy, washability, cushioning, thermal insulation, acoustic insulation, filtration, use as a bacterial barrier and sterility. These properties are often combined to create fabrics suited for specific jobs and can mimic the appearance, texture and strength of a woven fabric.

Non-woven materials are used in numerous applications, including:

=== Medical ===
- isolation gowns
- surgical gowns
- surgical drapes and covers
- surgical masks
- surgical scrub suits
- caps
- medical packaging: porosity allows gas sterilization
- gloves
- shoe covers
- bath wipes
- wound dressings
- drug delivery
- plasters

=== Filters ===
- gasoline, oil and air – including HEPA filtration
- water, coffee, tea bags
- pharmaceutical industry
- mineral processing
- liquid cartridge and bag filters
- vacuum bags
- allergen membranes or laminates with non woven layers

=== Geotextiles ===
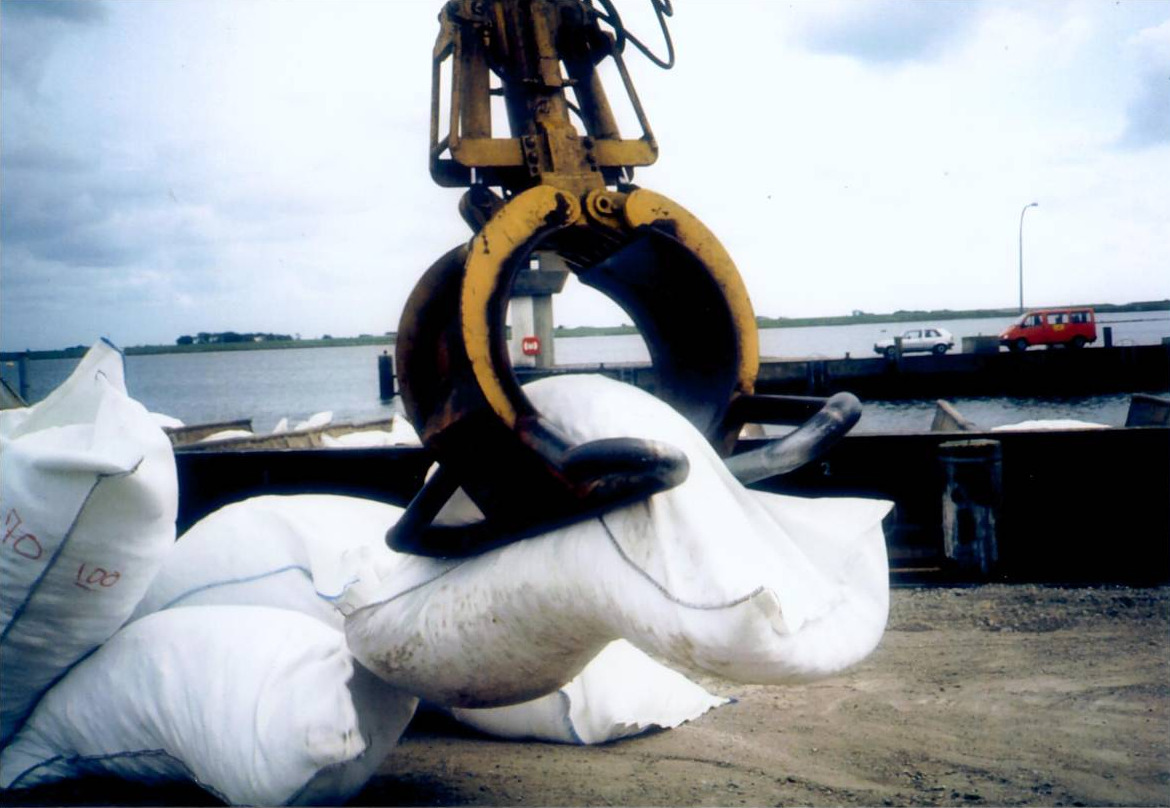
Nonwoven geotextile bags are much more robust than woven bags of the same thickness.

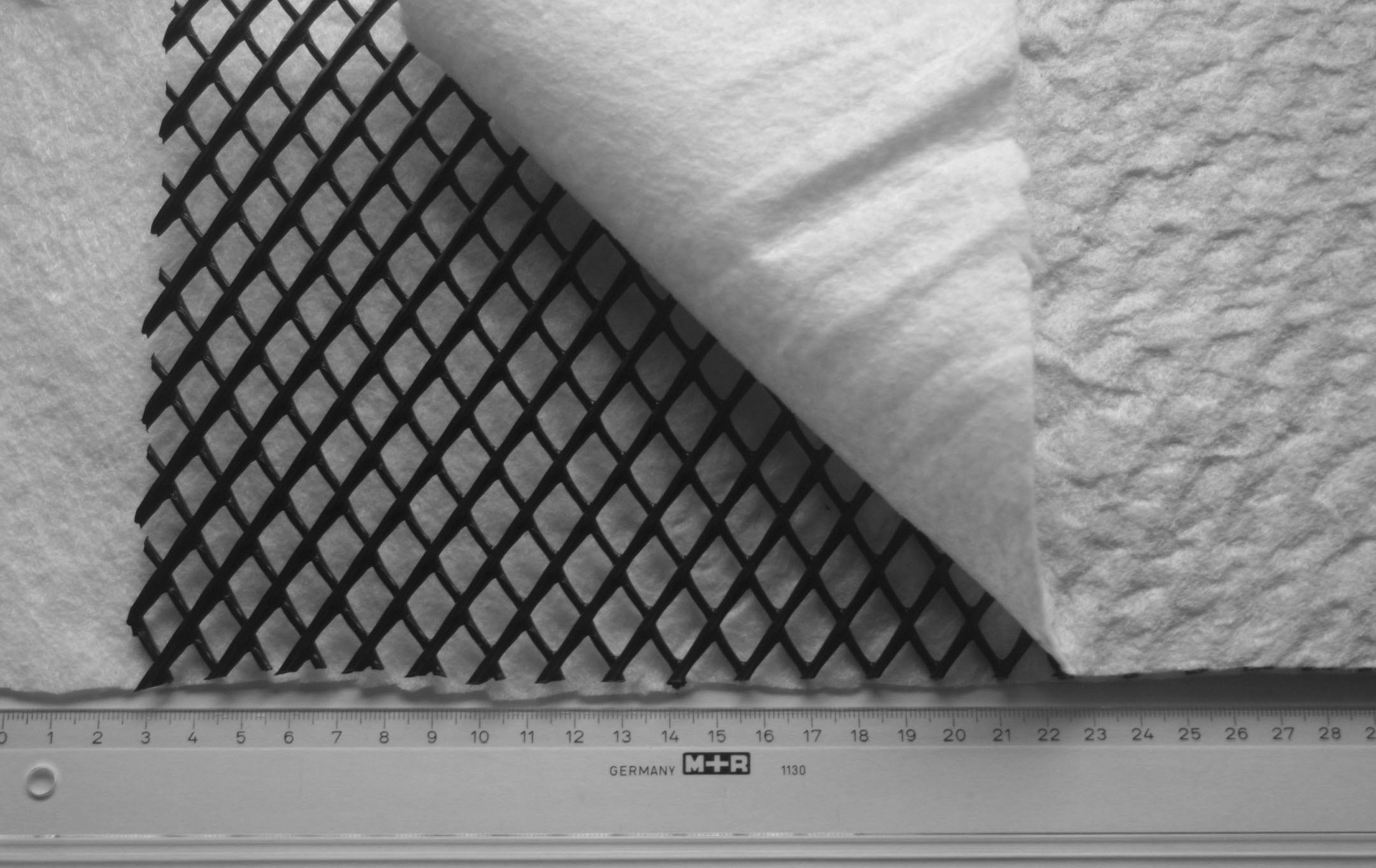
Geocomposite drain consisting of needle-punched nonwoven filter and carrier geotextiles of polypropylene staple fibers each having a mass per area of 200 g/m^{2}.

Nonwoven geotextile containers (sand bags) are used for

- soil stabilizers and roadway underlayment
- foundation stabilizers
- erosion control
- canal construction
- drainage systems
- geomembrane protection
- frost protection
- pond and canal water barriers
- sand infiltration barrier for drainage tile
- landfill liners

They are more robust in handling as compared to their woven counterparts, and therefore were often preferred in large-scale erosion protection projects such as those at Amrumbank West; Narrow Neck, Queensland; Kliffende house on Sylt island, and the Eider Barrage. In the last case, only 10 bags out of 48,000 were damaged despite a high installation rate of 700 bags per day.

=== Other ===
- diaperstock, feminine hygiene, and other absorbent materials
- carpet backing, primary and secondary
- composites
  - marine sail laminates
  - tablecover laminates
  - chopped strand mat
- backing/stabilizer for machine embroidery
- packaging where porosity is needed
- Shopping bags
- insulation (fiberglass batting)
- acoustic insulation for appliances, automotive components, and wall-paneling
- pillows, cushions, mattress cores, and upholstery padding
- batting in quilts or comforters
- consumer and medical face masks
- mailing envelopes
- tarps, tenting and transportation (lumber, steel) wrapping
- disposable clothing (foot coverings, coveralls)
- weather resistant house wrap
- cleanroom wipes
- Labels
- potting material for plants
- Reusable shopping bag
- Thermal insulation
- Sorbents
- Surface protection
- wallcovering
- Wet wipe

== Manufacturing processes ==
Nonwovens are typically manufactured by putting small fibers together in the form of a sheet or web (similar to paper on a paper machine), and then binding them either mechanically (as in the case of felt, by interlocking them with serrated needles such that the inter-fiber friction results in a stronger fabric), with an adhesive, or thermally (by applying binder (in the form of powder, paste, or polymer melt) and melting the binder onto the web by increasing temperature).

=== Staple nonwovens ===
Staple nonwovens are made in four steps. Fibers are first spun, cut to a few centimeters length, and put into bales. The staple fibers are then blended, "opened" in a multistep process, dispersed on a conveyor belt, and spread in a uniform web by a wetlaid, airlaid, or carding/crosslapping process. Wetlaid operations typically use 0.25 to 0.75 in (0.64 to 1.91 cm) long fibers, but sometimes longer if the fiber is stiff or thick. Airlaid processing generally uses 0.5 to 4.0 in (1.3 to 10.2 cm) fibers. Carding operations typically use ~1.5 in (3.8 cm) long fibers. Rayon used to be a common fiber in nonwovens, now greatly replaced by polyethylene terephthalate (PET) and polypropylene. Fiberglass is wetlaid into mats for use in roofing and shingles. Synthetic fiber blends are wetlaid along with cellulose for single-use fabrics. Staple nonwovens are bonded either thermally or by using resin. Bonding can be throughout the web by resin saturation or overall thermal bonding or in a distinct pattern via resin printing or thermal spot bonding. Conforming with staple fibers usually refers to a combination with melt blowing, often used in high-end textile insulations.

=== Melt-blown ===
Melt-blown nonwovens are produced by extruding melted polymer fibers through a spin net or die consisting of up to 40 holes per inch to form long thin fibers which are stretched and cooled by passing hot air over the fibers as they fall from the die. The resultant web is collected into rolls and subsequently converted to finished products. The extremely fine fibers (typically polypropylene) differ from other extrusions, particularly spun bond, in that they have low intrinsic strength but much smaller size offering key properties. Often melt blown is added to spun bond to form SM or SMS webs, which are strong and offer the intrinsic benefits of fine fibers such as fine filtration, low pressure drop as used in face masks or filters and physical benefits such as acoustic insulation as used in dishwashers. One of the largest users of SM and SMS materials is the disposable diaper and feminine care industry.

=== Spunbond nonwovens ===
Spunbond nonwovens are made in one continuous process. Fibers are spun and then directly dispersed into a web by deflectors or can be directed with air streams. This technique leads to faster belt speeds, and cheaper costs. Several variants of this concept are available, such as the REICOFIL machinery. PP spunbonds run faster and at lower temperatures than PET spunbonds, mostly due to the difference in melting points

Spunbond has been combined with melt-blown nonwovens, conforming them into a layered product called SMS (spun-melt-spun). Melt-blown nonwovens have extremely fine fiber diameters but are not strong fabrics. SMS fabrics, made completely from PP are water-repellent and fine enough to serve as disposable fabrics. Melt-blown is often used as filter media, being able to capture very fine particles. Spunbond is bonded by either resin or thermally. Regarding the bonding of Spunbond, Rieter has launched a new generation of nonwovens called Spunjet.

=== Spunlace nonwovens ===
Spunlace nonwovens are made by a process called hydroentanglement. This process uses high-pressure jets of water to entangle fibers together, creating a strong, durable fabric. The process begins with a web of fibers, which can be natural or synthetic, laid out on a conveyor belt.

The web is then passed through a series of jets that spray water at high pressure onto the fibers. The water jets cause the fibers to tangle and interlock, forming a strong bond between them. The web is then dried and finished to create the desired product.

=== Flashspun ===
Flashspun fabrics are created by spraying a dissolved resin into a chamber, where the solvent evaporates.

=== Air-laid paper ===
Air-laid paper is a textile-like material categorized as a nonwoven fabric made from wood pulp. Unlike the normal papermaking process, air-laid paper does not use water as the carrying medium for the fiber. Fibers are carried and formed to the structure of paper by air.

=== Other ===
Nonwovens can also start with films and fibrillate, serrate or vacuum-form them with patterned holes. Fiberglass nonwovens are of two basic types. Wet laid mat or "glass tissue" use wet-chopped, heavy denier fibers in the 6 to 20 micrometre diameter range. Flame attenuated mats or "batts" use discontinuous fine denier fibers in the 0.1 to 6 range. The latter is similar, though run at much higher temperatures, to melt-blown thermoplastic nonwovens. Wet laid mat is almost always wet resin bonded with a curtain coater, while batts are usually spray bonded with wet or dry resin. An unusual process produces polyethylene fibrils in a Freon-like fluid, forming them into a paper-like product and then calendering them to create Tyvek.

=== Bonding ===
Several methods can be used:

- thermal bonding
  - use of a heat sealer
  - using a large oven for curing
  - calendering through heated rollers (called spunbond when combined with spunlaid webs), calenders can be smooth faced for an overall bond or patterned for a softer bond.
- hydroentanglement: mechanical intertwining of fibers by water jets (also called spunlace)
- ultrasonic pattern bonding: used in high-loft insulation, quilts and bedding.
- needlepunching/needlefelting: mechanical intertwining of fibers by needles
- chemical bonding (wetlaid process): use of binders (such as latex emulsion or solution polymers) to chemically join the fibers. An expensive route that uses binder fibers or powders that soften and melt to hold other non-melting fibers together
  - one type of cotton staple nonwoven is treated with sodium hydroxide to shrink bond the mat, the caustic causes the cellulose-based fibers to curl and shrink around one another as the bonding technique
  - one unusual polyamide(Cerex) is self-bonded with gas-phase acid
- melt-blown: fiber is bonded as air attenuated fibers intertangle with themselves during simultaneous fiber and web formation.

== Disposability ==
The industry has attempted to define "flushability". They encourage voluntary testing of flushability by producers. They also encourage clear marking of non-flushable products as "No Flush" (rather than fine print on the bottom of products) including creating a "No Flush" logo.

The wastewater industry is encouraging a standard definition (rather than one which varies with each producer) of flushability, including dispersibility, and third-party assessment or verification, such as by NSF International. They believe that products should be safe for both septic and sewer systems (flushable and dispersible, respectively). Orange County Sanitation District has created a campaign, "What 2 Flush", which recommends flushing only the "three P's—pee, poop and [toilet] paper".

== See also ==
- Disposable towel
