= Hot air =

Hot air may refer to:

- Heat
- A lie, exaggeration, nonsense

== In science and engineering ==
- Hot air airship
- Hot air balloon
- Hot air boat
- Hot air engine
- Hot air gun
- Hot air oven
- Hot air reflow

== In economics ==
- Hot air (economics)

== As a proper noun ==
- Hot Air, an American conservative political blog
- Hot Air (film), a 2019 American comedy-drama film directed by Frank Coraci
- HOTAIR, a human gene (short for "HOX transcript antisense RNA")
- "Hot Air", an episode of The Wind in the Willows

== See also ==
- Hot Air Club
- The Hot Air Salesman, 1937 Fleischer Studios animated short film
- Into Hot Air, 2007 book by Chris Elliott
