= Dry heat =

Dry heat or Dry Heat may refer to:

- Dry heat created by convection, direct fire or smoke used in food preparation
- Aridity or dry climate
- Hot air free from water vapour, used in dry heat sterilization
- Dry Heat (manga), Japanese manga published in 2002

== See also ==
- Hot air (disambiguation)
