= Pop-Pop (disambiguation) =

Pop-Pop is a 2010 album by Joan Jeanrenaud, an American cellist.

Pop-Pop may also refer to:

- Pop pop boat, a toy
- Pop Pop, a 1991 album by Ricky Lee Jones
- Poppop, a 2025 EP by NCT Wish
- Pop-Pop or Phillip Margera Sr. of the CKY crew
- "Pop, pop!", the catchphrase of the Community character Magnitude
