= Thermojet =

Thermojet might refer to one of two dis-similar jet engine designs:

- a motorjet, in which the compressor is driven by a piston engine instead of a turbine
- a valveless pulse jet
