= Stenter =

Machine used in textile finishing

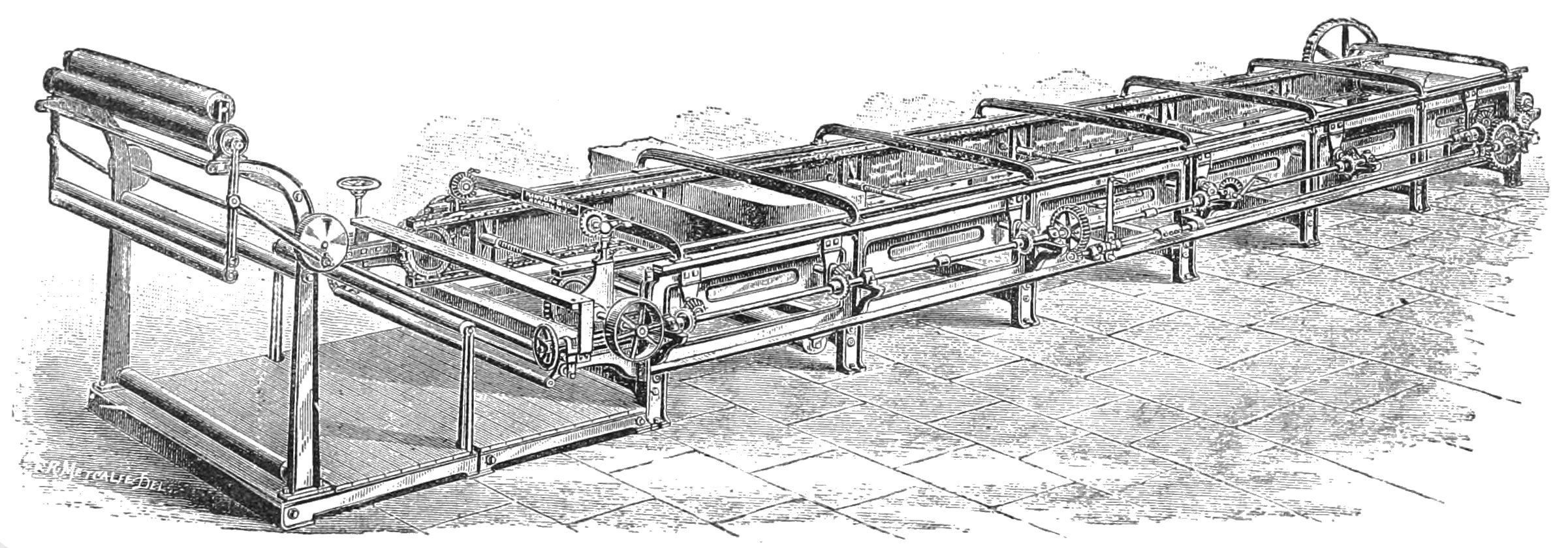
Hot air drying and tentering machine

A stenter (sometimes called a tenter) is a machine used in textile finishing. It serves multiple purposes, including heat setting, drying, and applying various chemical treatments. This may be achieved through the use of certain attachments such as padding or coating.

The machine works by holding the fabric's edges while it is fed from rollers, allowing it to advance gradually while maintaining its dimensions. Eventually, the stretched sheet is pulled off at a specific speed by a second set of rollers. At the delivery end, the edges are released by the stenter pins or clamps that were holding it.

The earlier non-mechanized equivalent was the tenter frame.

== Etymology and history ==
Stenter is derived from "tenter", which has its origins in the Latin word tendere, meaning "to stretch", passing through an intermediate French stage. The primary purpose of this machine is to stretch and dry fabric. In the past, frames used for this purpose were called "tenters", and the metal hooks employed to hold the fabric to the frame were known as "tenterhooks".

=== History ===
Tenters were primarily utilized to process woolen fabric. During the cleaning process, after squeezing out excess water, crumpled woolen cloth needed to be straightened and dried under tension; otherwise, it would shrink. The wet cloth was stretched on a large wooden frame, referred to as a "tenter", and left to dry. To accomplish this, lengths of wet cloth were fastened to the tenter's perimeter using hooks (nails driven through the wood) all around the frame. This ensured that, as the cloth dried, it would maintain its shape and size.

Initially, the tentering process was conducted in the open air when Higher Mill was constructed, with the tenter frames erected on the hillside to the east of the mill. However, toward the end of World War I, the process was brought indoors and utilized steam heating for drying. Over time, this technique evolved into the modern-day stenter machine.

== Function ==
The process of drying textiles is known to consume a significant amount of energy. The stenter machine is a commonly used machinery within the textile finishing section. There is a variety of stenters with multiple functionalities that are commercially available.

The Stenter machine consists of heated chambers, adjustable to the width of the fabric being treated. The fabric is fed into the heated chamber and supported at either selvedge by a series of stenter pins or clamps, which help maintain its position as it is moved through the drying chambers. (Note: Stenter pins are the modern equivalent of tenterhooks)

The input and output speed of the fabric are closely controlled, as is the output width, which determines the moisture content of the fabric after drying and its dimensional stability.

=== Holding hook types ===
1. Pins
2. Clips

== Uses ==
A stenter is a very useful machine in a textile process house, and the machine plays a vital role in finishing. The machine may be equipped with a padding mangle, which is useful in squeezing excess moisture and applying various finishes such as wrinkle-free, water repellent, waterproof, anti-static, or flame retardant. Coating and dyeing applications are also possible on a stenter machine with suitable padders and coating attachments.

There are various optional attachments such as a tendamatic, weft straightener, bowing and skew cameras, or ones that can affect over-feeding, edge gumming and trimming, or residual moisture control which help increase its functionality and usage. A stenter is primarily used for the following:

- Breaking and adjustment of the width.
- Application of softeners and various chemical finishes. Most of the textile finishes are applied to the stenter machine. Regular softeners that specialize finishes are applied with wet-to-wet or dry-to-wet finishing modes. The dry-to-wet finishing route is preferred where more of the chemical is required.
- Curing, stenter is used in curing the fabrics treated with certain chemicals such as resins and many other crosslinking polymers. Depending upon the requirements, there are two methods of curing the materials. The first is during drying, and another is after drying with another passage, maintaining a certain speed and temperature on the machine. The process of curing improves in fixing the fabrics for creases (wrinkle free), shape memory, and dimensional stability, etc.
- Adjusting overfeed GSM (grams per square meter), and manipulating the courses and wales, or the picks and ends, in knitted and woven fabrics, respectively.
- Controlling shrinkage by overfeeding/increasing input and controlling output speeds. In the process of overfeeding, fabric is fed to the stenter at a rate exceeding the speed at which it is being delivered.
- Heatsetting both pre-heatsetting and post-heatsetting of the fabrics. Heatsetting helps in stabilizing synthetic fabrics such as polyester, nylon, and spandex.
- Bowing and skew control especially in stripe fabrics.
- Color applications.
