= Chuts =

Victorian era Jewish immigrants to London

Chuts /ˈxʊts/ is the name applied to Jews who immigrated to London from the Netherlands in the mid-Victorian era (1850s–1860s). They typically came from the cities of Amsterdam and Rotterdam, and brought to London their trades: most notably those of cigar-, cap-, and slipper-making, and as small-time ship chandlers.

Their settlement began in the area beyond the Spitalfields known as the Tenterground, formerly an enclosed area where Flemish weavers stretched and dried their woven cloth on machines called tenters (hence the expression "on tenterhooks"). By the mid-Victorian era, the weavers began to disperse as the open grounds disappeared beneath housing built by speculative developers and became an enclave for Chut immigrants who established themselves as a distinct community. Demolished and rebuilt piecemeal in successive slum-clearance projects in the 1890s, 1930s and most notably after the devastation of The Blitz, the area is now bounded by White's Row, Wentworth Street, Bell Lane and Toynbee Street (formerly Shepherd Street).

Following the assassination of Alexander II of Russia in 1881, many thousands of Jewish refugees, fleeing the consequential pogroms in Eastern Europe, arrived in the East End of London, including the Tenterground, by which time the Chuts had begun to disperse. Significantly, the successful introduction of machinery for the mass production of cigarettes ultimately led to the collapse of the cigar-making economy on which the Chuts community depended. Many Chuts returned to improved conditions in Amsterdam, some emigrated further afield to places such as Australia and the United States, some assimilated into other Jewish families, and some eventually lost their Jewish identity altogether.

There was distinct rivalry between the Chuts and the later Jewish immigrants, not least because the Chuts had arrived as city-dwellers with useful industrial skills and by 1881 had already learned to speak English, whereas the later immigrants were generally impoverished rural workers who had to learn new trades in the notorious sweatshops and, arriving penniless and in great numbers, drew attention to the problem of immigration which resulted in the Aliens Act 1905.

Furthermore, the Chuts were treated with suspicion by other Jews because the former had developed specific customs and practices. Many of these families had lived in the Netherlands since the first synagogues were established there in the early 17th century and where, uniquely, Ashkenazim and Sephardim lived in close proximity for over two hundred years, resulting in a religious-cultural blend not found elsewhere. For example, the Chuts followed the Sephardi tradition by not banning kitniyot at Pesach. Furthermore, the Dutch Jews were well accustomed to the wealth of seafoods available in their cities, foods that were not strictly kosher. This tradition led to the Chuts becoming famous for the fried fish that began the British fish and chips trade, and also of the East End shellfish stands set up on major thoroughfares around the pubs near closing time.

== Etymology ==
The origin of the name Chuts is uncertain. A popular assumption is that it derives from the Dutch word goed (pronounced /ɣut/ and meaning "good") and is imitative of the foreign-language chatter that others heard. It is also Hebrew חוץ for "outside" or "in the street" and may have been applied to the Dutch Jews of London either because they were socially isolated or because many were street vendors. Another possibility is that the Hebrew word would have appeared increasingly in Amsterdam synagogue records as more and more emigrated to London, and others who followed would have "gone chuts" (i.e., emigrated).

The word Chut is sometimes used as a singular noun but is most likely a back-formation.

== Conditions in the Netherlands prior to immigration ==
Despite Napoleonic emancipation in 1793, Jews remained barred from entry into the guilds in the Netherlands and were not permitted to be shopkeepers (with few exceptions, e.g. kosher butchers) for fear of the competition they would present to other Dutch. They were also denied entry into the state school system.

In spite of the efforts of William III after the defeat of Napoleon, the Ashkenazi Dutch concentrated in Amsterdam in slum conditions and resisted integration. Prejudice against them, although not amounting to religious persecution, continued through the mid-19th century. These factors together with the ongoing decline of the Dutch economy prompted a flow of Jewish emigrants from Amsterdam.

Notably, Jews in the UK benefited from formal emancipation in 1858, after which they could become skilled tradesmen and conduct business freely without taking Christian oaths.

== See also ==
- Sandys Row Synagogue
- Ashkenazi Jews
- Sephardi Jews
- History of the Jews in the Netherlands
- Jewish ethnic diversity
