= Heatsetting =

Process used in the textile industry

Heat setting is a term used in the textile industry to describe a thermal process usually taking place in either a steam atmosphere or a dry heat environment. The effect of the process gives fibers, yarns or fabric dimensional stability and, very often, other desirable attributes like higher volume, wrinkle resistance or temperature resistance. Very often, heat setting is also used to improve attributes for subsequent processes.

Heat setting can eliminate the tendency of undesirable torquing. At the winding, twisting, weaving, tufting and knitting processes, the increased tendency to torquing can cause difficulties in processing the yarn. When using heat setting for carpet yarns, desirable results include not only the diminishing of torquing but also the stabilization or fixing of the fiber thread. Both twist stabilization and stabilization of frieze effect are results of the heat setting process. Heat setting benefits staple yarns as well as bulked continuous filament (BCF) yarns. Heat setting often causes synthetic fibers to gain volume as well. This volume growth is commonly described as "bulk development". All processes using temperature and/or moisture to give textiles one of the above-mentioned attributes are known as heat setting. The term "thermal fixation" is used less frequently. In the carpet industry, the process is exclusively called "heat setting".

== Crinkling tendency ==
The crinkle tendency is due to the technological conditions of the spun yarn production and the physical fiber properties. Above all, the "technological conditions of the spun yarn production" means the turning moment of the thread. A twisted thread will always try to untwist when it hangs freely between two fixed points in the form of a loop. In doing this, it gives up a part of its original twist which becomes spirals whose twisting direction is opposite to the original twist direction. This development of twist in the opposite direction occurs as the twisted yarn attempts to reach equilibrium.

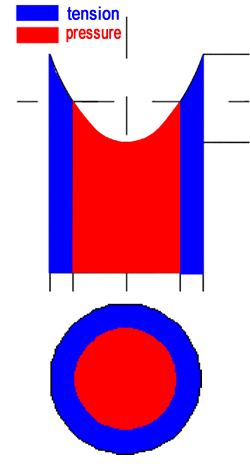
diagram by Müller

Twisting in the opposite direction is due to the tensions resulting from the yarn twisting that Mueller indicated in the diagram of tension and pressure. The total tension acting against the twisting is increased in relation to increased twisting due to the increasing tension and pressure of the bundle of fibres in the yarn. It may become so strong that the thread core buckles when it can no longer withstand the compressive strains. The yarn curls, meaning that the yarn tries to reach a state of equilibrium in which twists in the opposite direction from the original twist direction balance the yarn's torque. These twists are also called negative twists. In this state of equilibrium, the inner torsional tensions cancel each other out. The thread always buckles at a spot where the cross section is small due to the unevenness of the thread. During the spinning process this spot took up more twists and is therefore subjected to higher inner tensions, which ultimately break the thread core. Although thicker yarns are less twisted than fine ones, the inner tension rises opposite to the yarn size. Smaller yarn is more weakened by steaming. Further positive aspects of steaming are the reduction of curling and, at the same time, the setting of the physical properties of closeness and extension imparted to the yarn by twisting.

== The chemical process ==
There are completely different behaviors depending on the kind of yarn material. Much is known about the steaming of woolen yarns but more research is needed on the steaming behaviour of artificial fibers and cotton.

=== Wool ===
As soon as steam enters, the yarns quantity of moisture rises at once, caused by the heating of the yarn and by steam condensation. According to Speakmann the following phenomena can be seen in the stretched woolen fiber: The cystine side chains are subjected to a hydrolysis at the sulphur bridge, where cystine is dissolved into cysteine and a not yet isolated sulphonic acid.

Physical and chemical forces between two polypeptide chains: 1. Hydrogen bridges between peptide groups (polar bond); 2. Cystine bridge (covalent bond); 3. Salt bridge between two amino acids (ionic bond); 4. Hydrophobic bond between a valine and an isolyeine rest (non-polar bond); The broken ellipse shows the part where water is displaced.

An ionization can be seen at the bridges that were produced from salt liberation. Due to the increase of temperature in the fibers during steaming an oscillation of the molecules is produced which leads to the bursting of the hydrogen bridges; now residual valencies are set free which are able to saturate with the dipole water. The water then acts like a lubrication between the individual molecules. Thus the bonds of the main chains between each other are dissolved by the side chains, the individual polypeptide chains can shift against each other and the tensions find their equilibrium (see illustration 4). When the steaming of the yarn is continued, new side chains are formed between the individual components of the main chains. When finally the yarn is dried, i.e. the moisture balance occurring within the yarn, salt is liberated again and hydrogen bridges are formed. Now the individual polypeptide chains can no longer be shifted against each other and the fibers regain their former closeness, however without having remarkable tensions inside.

The yarn or doubled yarn twist is set. Of course, the morphological structure of the fibers must be considered when equalizing the tensions by steaming. Since the woolen fiber very quickly gets the temperature for breaking up the hydrogen bridges and the steam for hydrolysing the cystine bridges, a relatively quick twist modification is possible which roughly corresponds to the values of an autoclave moderated yarn; however, the steaming quality of the Steamatic steaming process is much better with reference to the evenness of moisture absorption.

=== Synthetic fiber ===
Fiber strength and elongation: 1. amorphous fiber domains; 2. crystalline fiber domains; 3. bonding force

Synthetic fibers can be divided up into two fiber domains, the crystalline (organized) domain and the amorphous (unorganized) domain. In crystalline domains physical forces of attraction are acting between the closely parallel lines of polymers. These forces acting transversely to the fiber axis make up the closeness of a fiber. If tension is applied to the fiber, these forces hinder the fiber from breaking.

In contrast, the amorphous fiber domains act like links of the fibers. They are responsible for the flexional strength of the fibers. Additionally, the amorphous fiber domains make it possible for water or dye to enter.

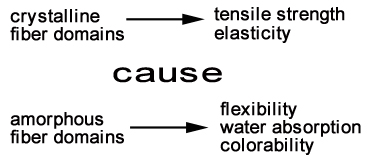
Properties of amorphous and crystalline fiber domains

During steaming, the heating of the fiber causes its molecules to start oscillating. The increase of oscillation that can be influenced by the degree and the period of heating dissolves the electric bond forces in the fiber; at first in the amorphous domains, later in the crystalline ones and at last in the polymers. As with wool, the tensions brought in by spinning are set free. During drying or cooling of the fiber, the binding forces are rebuilt without having tensions in the inner part.

The problem of synthetic fibers is that the reduction of the binding forces only takes place between the so-called deformation point (start of changing the firm solidified – amorphous fiber domains into a visco-elastic – easily deformable state) and the distortion point (the crystalline fiber domains change into a visco-elastic state, too) which is in a relatively high temperature range.

==== Glass transition temperature – and deformation point of artificial fiber ====
Material	Deformation point	Distortion temperature
Polyester	80–85 °C	230–240 °C
Nylon 6	80–85 °C	180–200 °C
Nylon 66	90–95 °C	220–235 °C

This is also an explanation for the fact that wool mixed with synthetic fibers is more difficult to set than pure wool. Setting synthetic fibers is only possible beyond a temperature range of 85 to 95 °C. In contrast, pure wool can set very well at these temperatures.

=== Cotton ===
In in-line steaming, cotton plays a more or less subordinate role. The exact physical or chemical process in the fiber are not well known.

== Applications in the carpet industry ==
The quality of cut pile carpets is improved significantly by a reduction of inner tensions in the yarn. This essential benefit results from the effects of steaming and heatsetting.

=== Carpet classification ===
Carpet styles are divided into two basic types. These types are loop pile carpets and cut pile carpets. Especially for cut-pile and its variations (Saxony, shag, frieze) the heat setting process is of highest importance.

=== Tip definition (pinpoint tip definition) ===
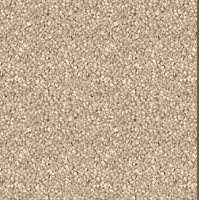
"Pinpoint tip definition" after Heatsetting

Usually, when yarn is cut, the ends fray similar to the way the ends of a braid or rope would fray when they are cut and a kind of a brush forms. This fraying must be avoided in cut-pile carpets by all means. A cut pile carpet with frayed yarn ends would have a poor appearance, a shorter life cycle and ergonomic disadvantages for the "walker" as scientific research has proven. The carpet is less elastic and doesn't absorb the steps of the user as well as a heat set carpet would. A carpet manufactured from heat set yarn is more attractive, durable and comfortable for the user. The added value of heatset carpet is significant. Normally a heat set carpet can be identified by its grainy structure, which is called "pinpoint tip definition" in the industry. The appearance of the cut pile ends is similar to pin points.

== Current heat setting processes ==
Several different heat setting processes are known in the textile industry. The most important are presented here.

=== Autoclave heat setting ===
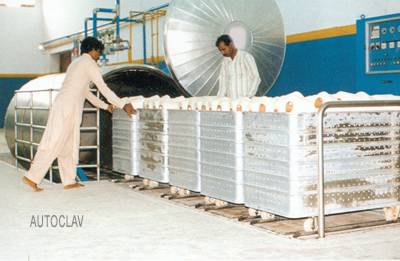
Autoclave Heatsetting

The oldest heat setting process is autoclave heat setting. Mostly, it is a discontinuous process. Autoclave installations use vacuum and/or pressure. Textile material is brought into the autoclave either on bobbins, in skeins or loose in a container. As nearly all autoclaves are exposed to certain pressures they are usually built in cylindrical shape and mounted horizontally. Most commonly, autoclaves are loaded and unloaded from the end of the cylinder but some may be loaded from one end and unloaded from the other end. Autoclaves mounted vertically exist but are less common. They are mostly used for the synthetic yarns like polyester, polyethylene, poly propylene and nylons.

=== Steamatic process ===
For automation in link spinning/winding there is the so-called "in-line steamer". The first known process of this type is the Steamatic process by Resch. In this case the heat setting process happens in between the ring spinning and the winding machines. As soon as the ring spinning frame has finished spinning, the loaded bobbins are transported into the in-line steamer. Those bobbins are steamed there with a vacuum method and dried again within seconds. After steaming and drying, the bobbins are transported on to the winding machine where they are re-wound onto a cross-wound package.

The carpet industry currently utilizes two continuous processes, the Power-Heat-Set process and the TVP process which was derived from the autoclave technology.

=== Power-Heat-Set technology ===
The Power-Heat-Set process, formerly known as Suessen process, was developed in the beginning of the 1970s and was the first continuous heat setting system worldwide. The process itself was revolutionary in that it was the first system not operated with saturated steam and pressure, but with a superheated steam/airmix at atmospheric pressure. Using this innovative technology, completely new carpet collections were created. In the Power-Heat-Set process, the yarns and filaments oxidize slightly on the surface due to the existing oxygen in the surrounding atmosphere and the higher temperatures. This capillary oxide film causes the complete carpet later to be more stain resistant. Dirt particles adhere less to the fibers.

=== SUPERBA TVP process ===
In addition to the Power-Heat-Set technology there is the SUPERBA TVP3 process which is also a continuous process. In the TVP3 process yarn is placed on a conveyor belt and inserted through a lock into a pressure tunnel that could be up to 15 m long. Inside the tunnel, it undergoes a heat setting process with saturated steam. At the end of the tunnel the yarn is taken out through a second lock. The yarn which is still hot and moist is dried and cooled after heat setting and fed to the winding process. Up to 72 yarn ends can be processed at the same time.

== Process description (exemplary with the Power-Heat-Set process) ==
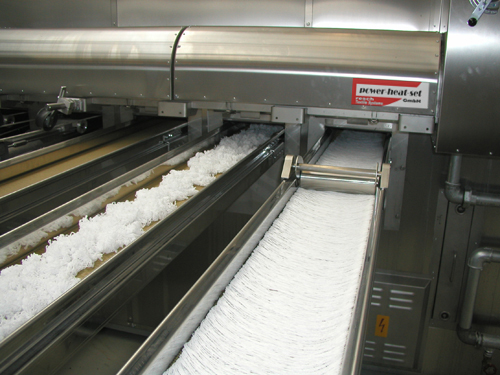
Frieze and straight Yarn after Power-Heat-Setting

In the Power-Heat-Set process yarn is heat set with superheated steam in an open system at atmospheric pressure. All the materials normally used in the carpet industry such as polyamide 6, polyamide 6.6, polypropylene, Acrylic, PET, polyester and wool can be processed.

The unprocessed yarn is provided on packages in a creel (up to 72 packages). At a speed of up to 700 m/min, the yarn is pulled off the packages and entered into the heat setting process. There are two basic ways of transportation of the yarn through the process. One way is to place the yarn in coils or a "figure 8 pattern on a belt or to wrap it onto ropes arranged as a polygon in order to convey it through the process. With Frieze yarns only belt conveying is utilized. Frieze is produced by a special stuffer box, the so-called Twinroll-Box (TRB). The heat setting process takes place at temperatures between 110 °C and 200 °C in a steam-air-mix. After heat setting, the yarn is cooled and wound onto packages again at the winder. In general a heat setting machine consists of six lines at eight ends (fibers) each. A daily production of up to 10.5 tons is possible.

== Sources ==
- Textil-Praxis (1958), 401 - "Befeuchtung oder Dämpfen von Wollgarnen"
- Textilbetrieb (1981), 29 - "Gleichmäßige Effekte beim Garndämpfen" (Uniform effects in yarn fampering. In: Textile plant)
- Dr. H.-J. Henning, Dr.-Ing. Cl. Sustmann - Melliand Textilberichte "Untersuchungen über das Vakuumdämpfen von Wollgarnen" (Investigations on vacuum vapors of wool yarns) (1966), pp. 530
- Jens Holm Dittrich, Paul Naefe, Johann Kreitz - Melliand Textilberichte "Verfahren zur Drallberuhigung von Wollgarnen durch Kurzzeitdämpfen" (Procedure for swinging wool yarns by short-term fumes) (1986), p. 817
- Jens Holm Dittrich, Attila Bereck, Günter Blanckenburg - Melliand Textilberichte "Untersuchungen über das Vergilben von Wollgarnen beim Dämpfen" (Investigations into the yellowing of wool yarns when filling) (1983),
- Jens Holm Dittrich, Gesine Töpert - Melliand Textilberichte "Ursachen der Vergilbung von Kammzugsbumps und Kreuzspulen bei der HF-Trocknung" (Causes of the yellowing of comb train sbumps and cross-spools in HF drying) (1988), pp. 288
- Dr. Oskar Becker - Melliand Textilberichte "Spannfäden in Wollgarnen" (Tension threads in wool yarns) (1977), pp. 97
- Patenanmeldung DP 3601099.5 H. Kranz GmbH & Co. 5100 Aachen "Verfahren zum Fixieren von Garnen"
- W. Schefer - Eidg. Materialprüfungs - und Versuchsanstalt, St. Gallen "Verän-derung der Wolle durch Wärmebehandlungen im Veredelungsbereich" (Change of wool through heat treatments in the finishing area)
- Hans Erich Schiecke - Verlag Schiele & Schön "Wolle als textiler Rohstoff" (wool as textile raw material)
- K. Kröll - Springer Verlag, Heidelberg, Berlin, New York "Trocknungstechnik" (Drying technology) Volume II/I
- Peter Toggweiler, Simon Gleich, Freddy Wanger, F.Steiner – Meliand Textil-berichte No. 9/1995 "Qualitätsverbesserung der mit Contexxor konditionierten Baumwollgarne" (Quality improvement of the cotton yarn conditioned with Contexxor)
- Dipl.-Ing. Gisela Axt - W. Bertelsmann Verlag KG Bielefeld 1986, "Beurtei-lungsmerkmale textiler Faserstoffe", Band1/2/3Dr. Oskar Becker - Melliand Textilberichte "Spannfäden in Wollgarnen" (1977), 97
- heat setting
