= Petticoat Lane Market =

Clothing market in London

Petticoat Lane Market: Middlesex Street Market and Wentworth Street Market
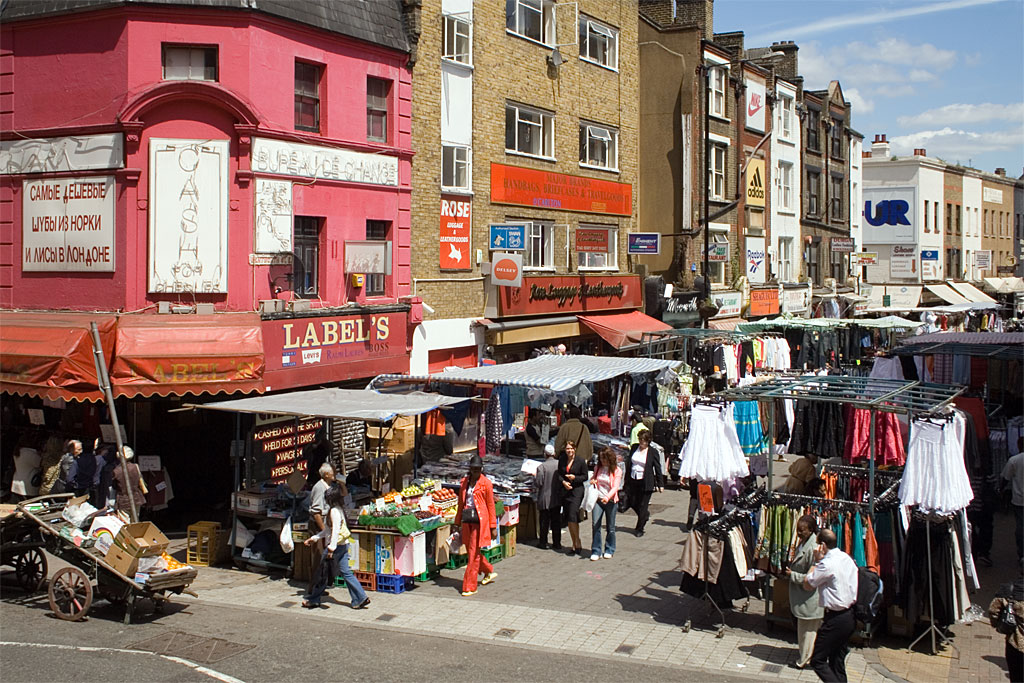
- The market in 2006
- Location: Spitalfields London, E1 United Kingdom; 51°31′0″N 0°4′24″W
- Management: Tower Hamlets London Borough Council
- Owner: Tower Hamlets London Borough Council
- Environment: Outdoor
- Goods sold: Clothing, general goods
- Days normally open: Sunday (Middlesex Street); Sunday–Friday (Wentworth Street)
- Number of tenants: 202 (Middlesex Street); 138 (Wentworth Street)
- Interactive map of Petticoat Lane Market

Petticoat Lane Market is a fashion and clothing market in Spitalfields, London. It consists of two adjacent street markets. Wentworth Street Market is open six days a week and Middlesex Street Market is open on Sunday only.

== The modern market ==
It is one of a number of traditional markets located to the east of the City of London. A few hundred yards to the north is Old Spitalfields Market, which has been refurbished, and across Commercial Street, to the east, lies Brick Lane Market. A half mile further east is the Columbia Road Flower Market in Bethnal Green. Petticoat Lane Market was not formally recognised until an Act of Parliament in 1936, but its long history as an informal market makes it possibly one of the oldest surviving markets in Britain.

The market is open Monday to Friday on Wentworth Street; on Sunday it extends over many of the surrounding streets, with over a thousand stalls. It is closed on Saturday, and on Sunday closes at about 2 pm. The markets are well signed from local stations. Petticoat Lane market is listed as a tourist attraction on VisitLondon.com, the official visitor guide for London. The name Petticoat Lane came from not only the sale of petticoats but from the fable that "they would steal your petticoat at one end of the market and sell it back to you at the other."

== History of the market ==
In Tudor times, Middlesex Street was known as Hogs Lane, a pleasant lane lined by hedgerows and elms. It is thought city bakers were allowed to keep pigs in the lane, outside the city wall; or possibly that it was an ancient droving trail. The lane's rural nature changed, and by 1590, country cottages stood by the city walls. By 1608, it had become a commercial district where second-hand clothes and cheap goods were sold and exchanged, known as 'Peticote Lane'. This was also where the Spanish ambassador had his house, and the area attracted many Spaniards from the reign of James I. Peticote Lane was severely affected by the Great Plague of 1665; the rich fled, and London lost a fifth of its population.

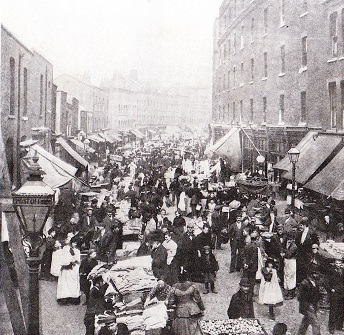
Middlesex Street Market, circa 1890

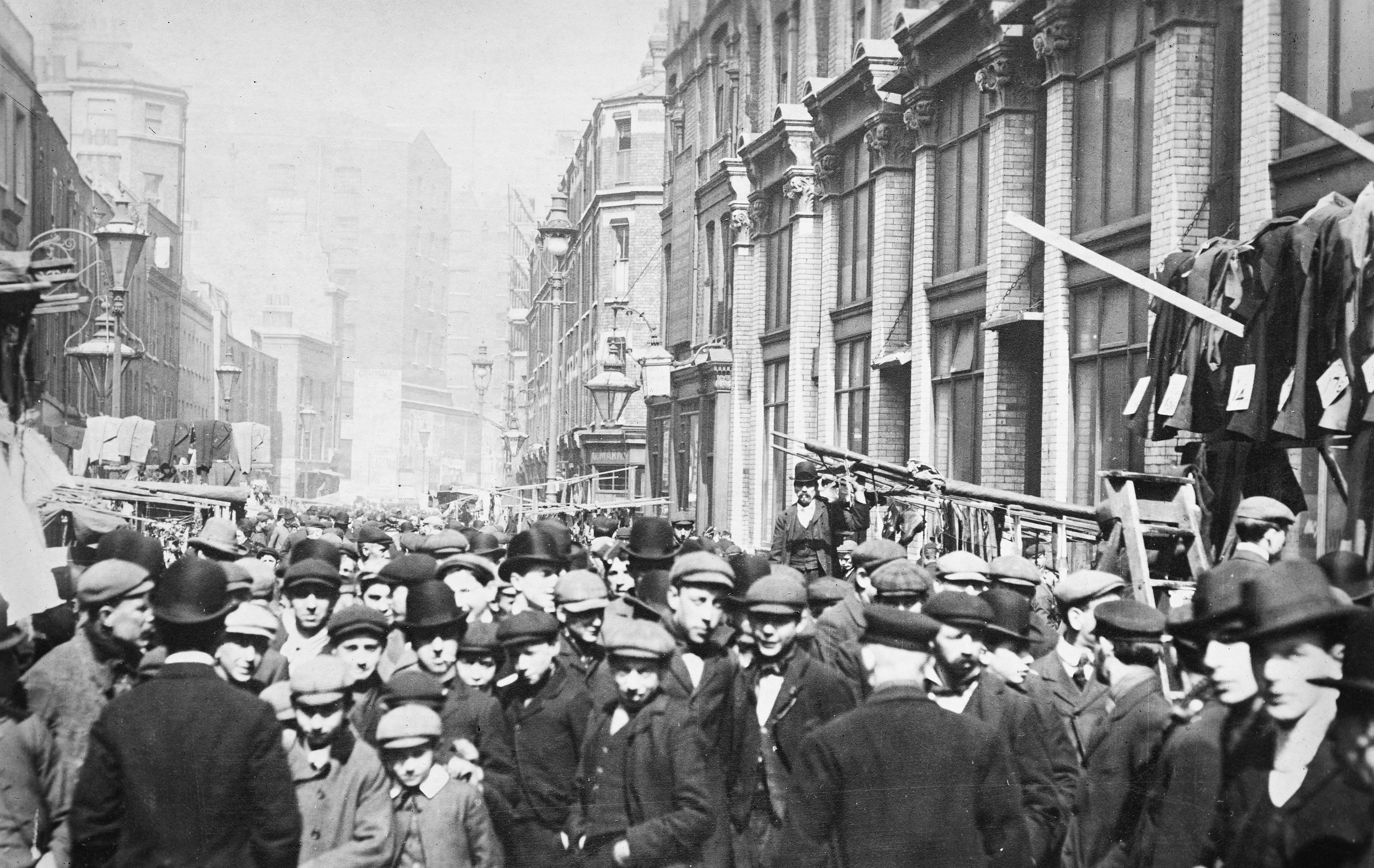
Petticoat Lane in the 1920s

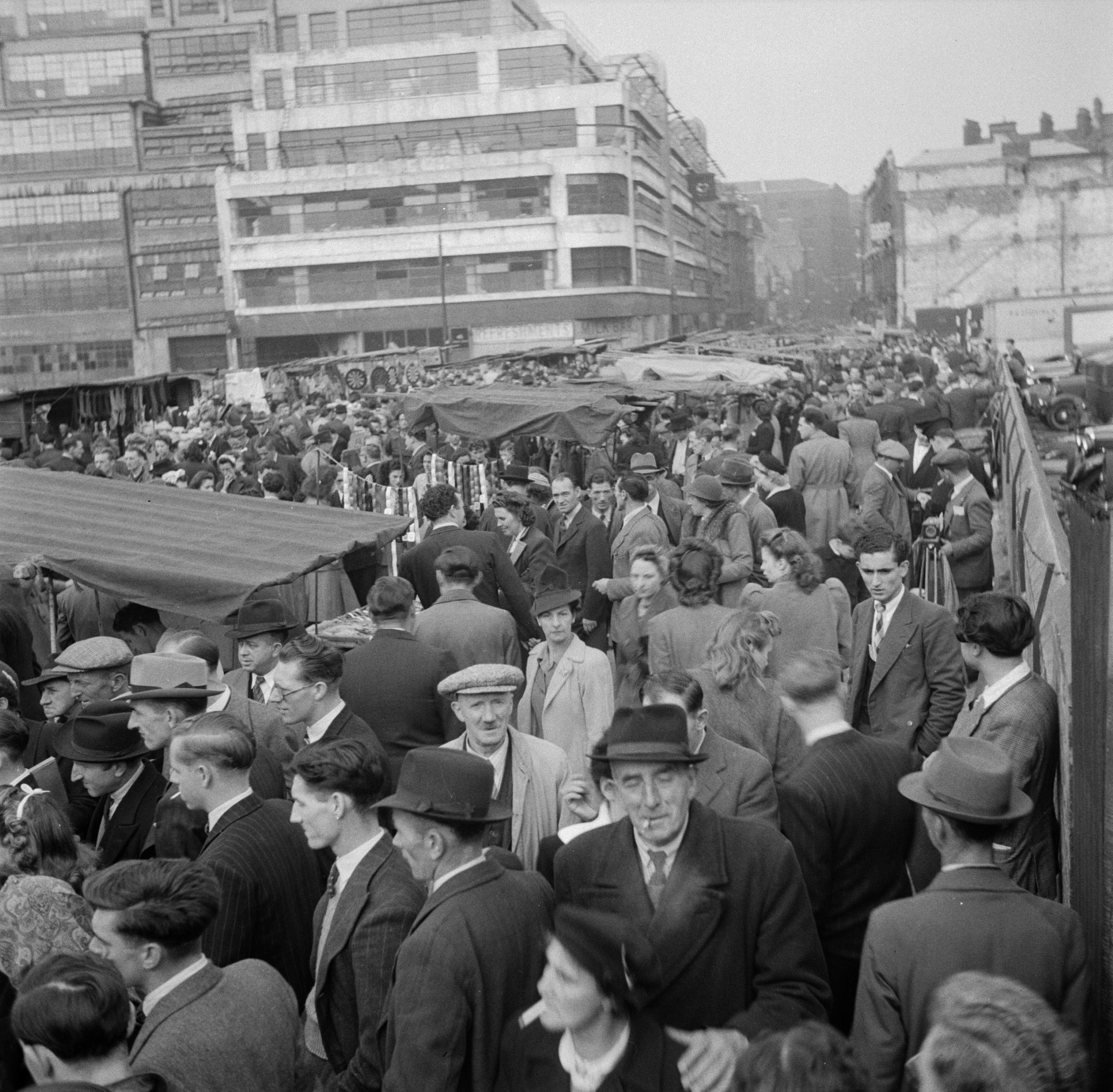
Petticoat Lane in 1947

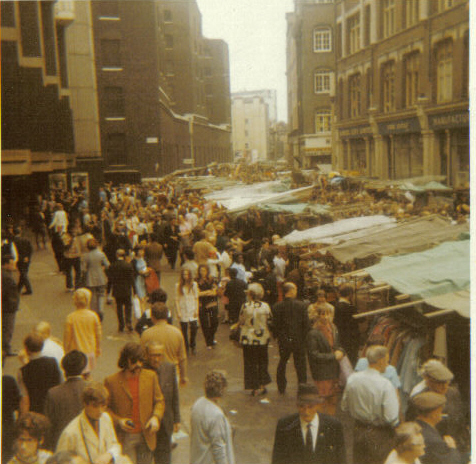
Petticoat Lane in 1971

Huguenots fleeing persecution arrived in the late 17th century; many settled in the area, and master weavers settled in the new town of Spitalfields. The area already had an association with clothing, with dyeing a local industry. The cloth was pegged out on hooks in the surrounding fields. These were known as tentergrounds. From the mid-18th century, Petticoat Lane became a centre for manufacturing clothes. The market served the well-to-do in the City, selling new garments. About 1830, Peticote Lane's name changed to Middlesex Street, to record the boundary between Portsoken Ward, in the City of London, and Whitechapel, which coincided with the Lane. But the old name continues to be associated with the area.

From 1882, a wave of Jewish immigrants fleeing persecution in eastern Europe settled in the area. The chapels, which had previously served the Huguenot community, were adapted as synagogues. Many Jewish relief societies were founded to aid the poor. Jewish immigrants entered the local garment industry and maintained the traditions of the market. The severe damage inflicted throughout the East End during the Blitz and later bombing in World War II served to disperse the Jewish communities to new areas. The area around Middlesex Street suffered a decline, but the market continued to prosper. Beginning in the 1970s, a new wave of immigration from India and east Asia restored the area's vitality - centred on nearby Brick Lane.

In previous times the market was unpopular with the authorities, as it was largely unregulated and in some sense illegal. As recently as the 1930s, police cars and fire engines were driven down The Lane, with alarm bells ringing, to disrupt the market. The rights of the market were finally protected by Act of Parliament in 1936. As late as the 1990s, if Christmas Day fell on a Sunday (which in that decade only occurred in 1994), many of the local Jewish traders would still assert their right to open on a Sunday. 'The Lane' was always renowned for the 'patter' and showmanship of the market traders. Some, selling crockery, would pile an entire setting onto a large plate, and then send the lot, high into the air. Catching the construction on its way down was to demonstrate the skill of the vendor, and the robustness of the porcelain.

A prominent businessman, Alan Sugar, got his start as a stall holder in the market. The market remains busy and vibrant, reflecting both its immigrant history and its continuing popularity with locals and tourists.

== Transport ==
- Aldgate East Underground station
- Aldgate Underground station
- Liverpool Street Station
- The area is well served by buses, on Bishopsgate and Aldgate and Whitechapel High Streets
- Parking restrictions apply, throughout the area, on all days of the week

== Gallery ==
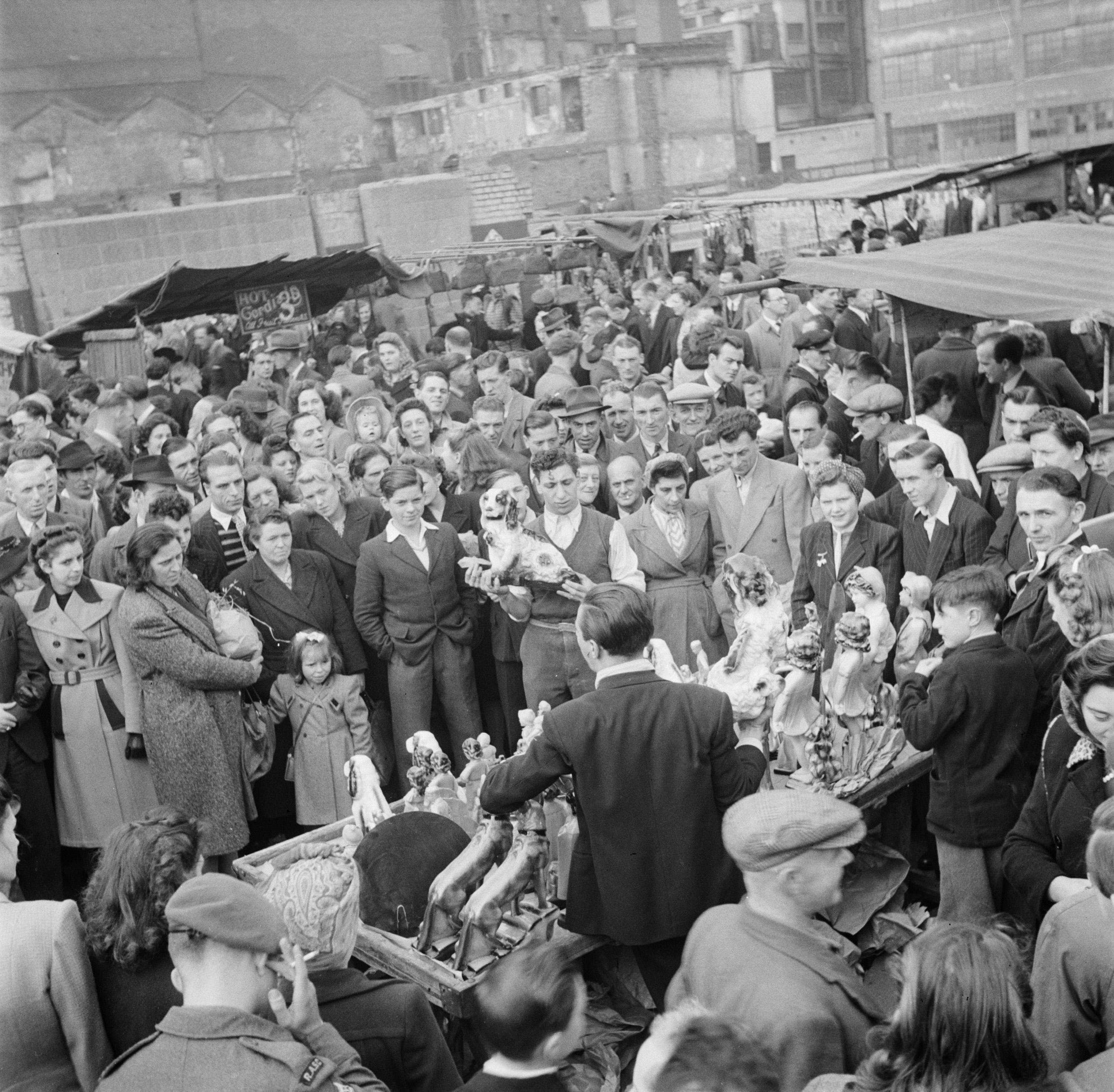
1947

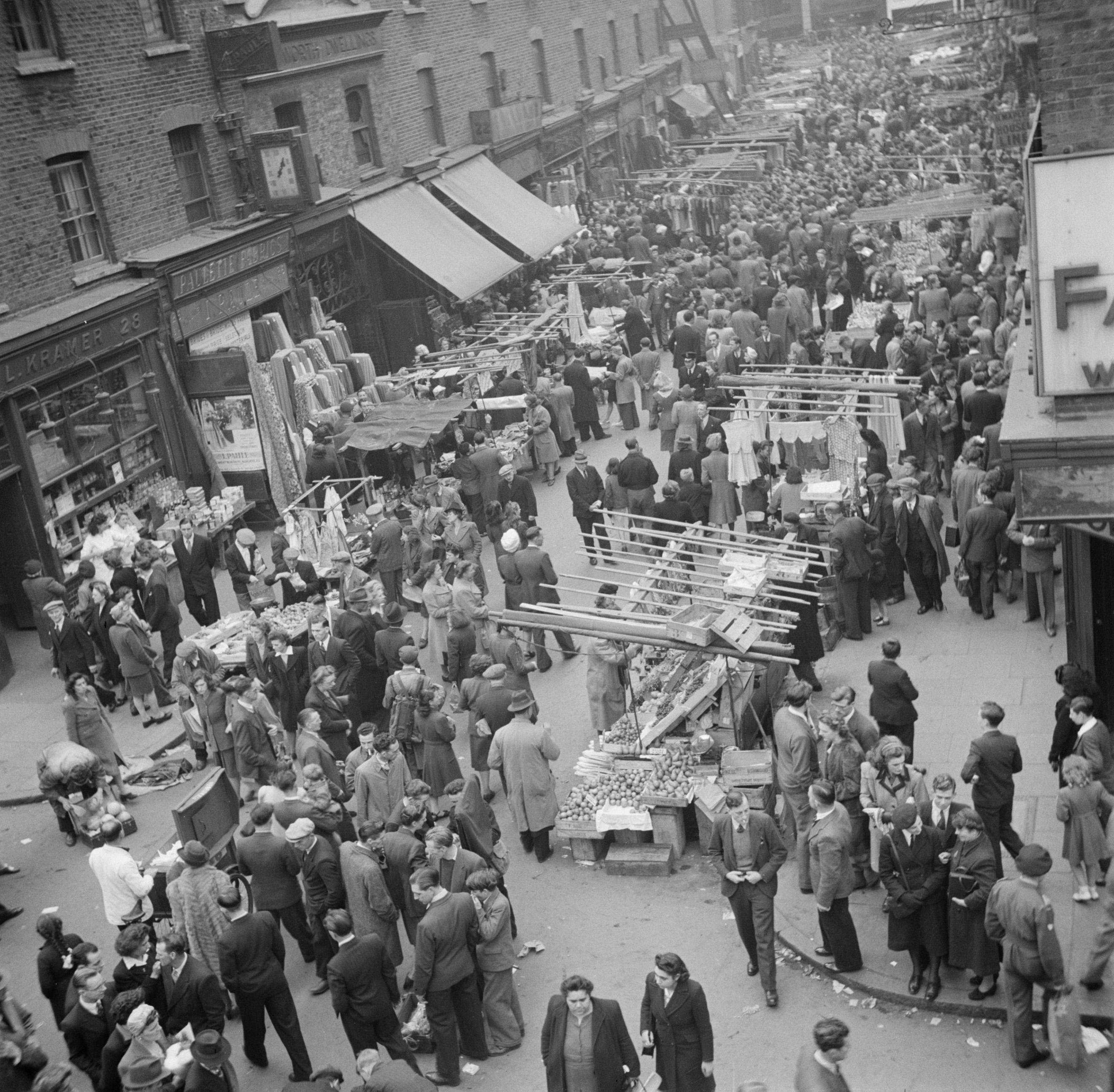
1947

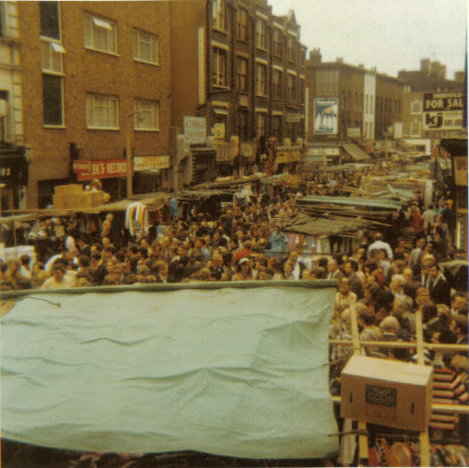
1971

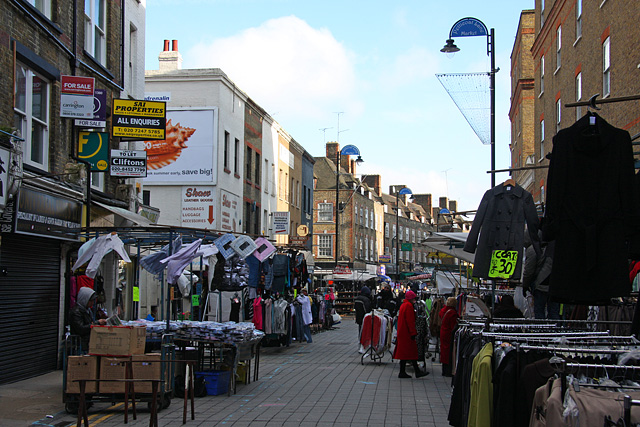
2009

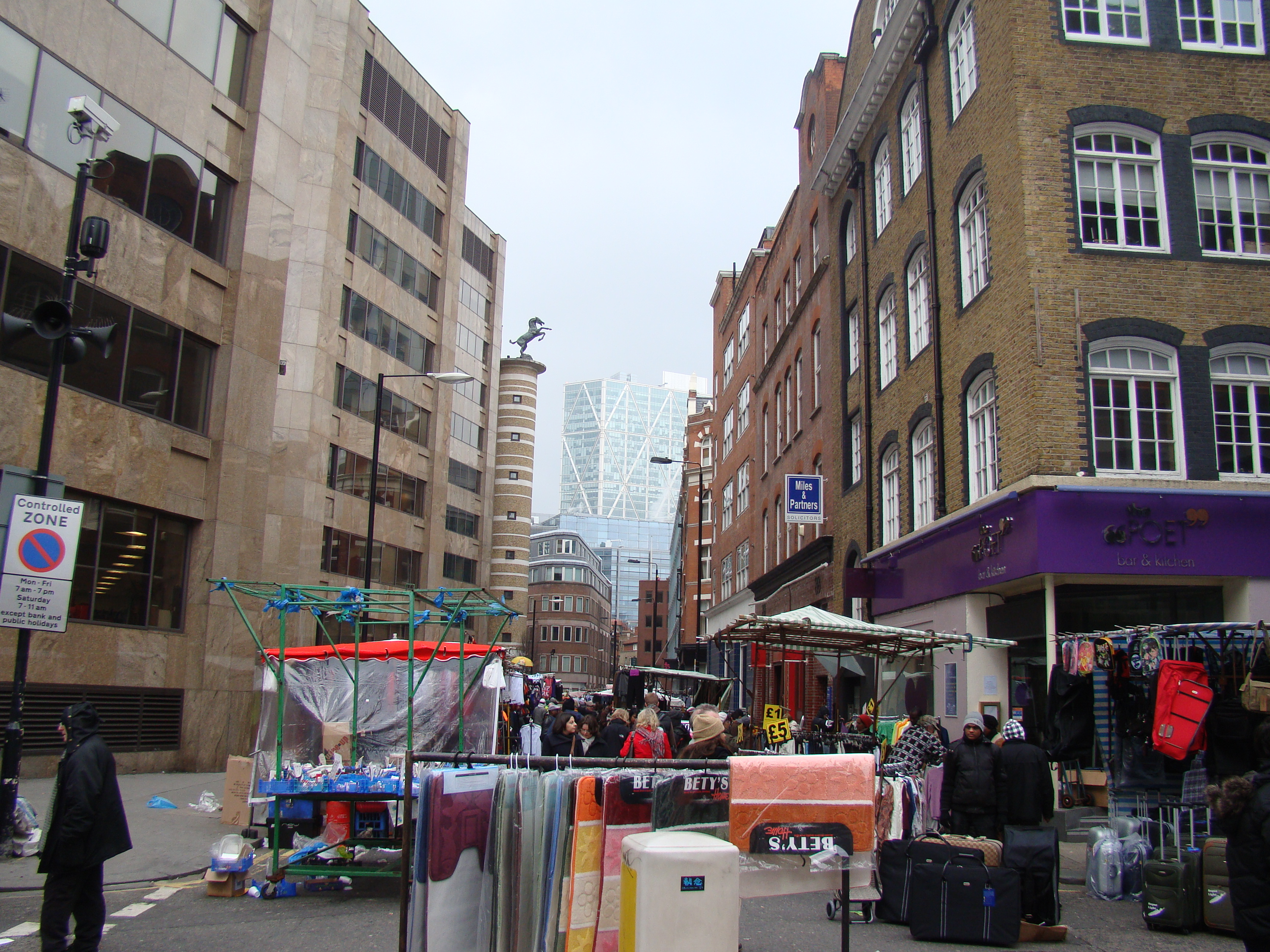
2010

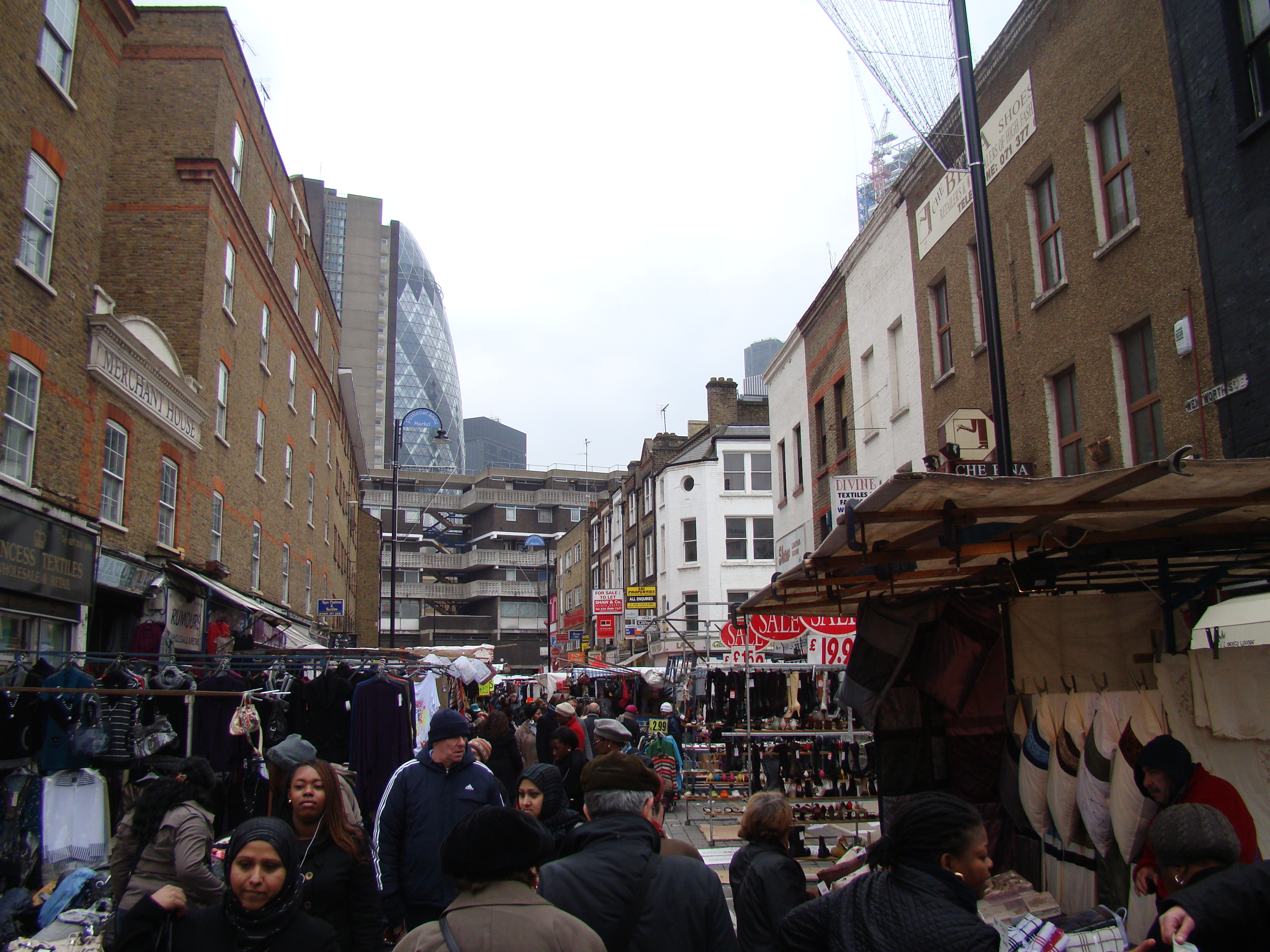
2010

== See also ==
- Marketplace
- Retail
- Tenterground
