= Tenterground =

Place where tenters are used for drying cloth

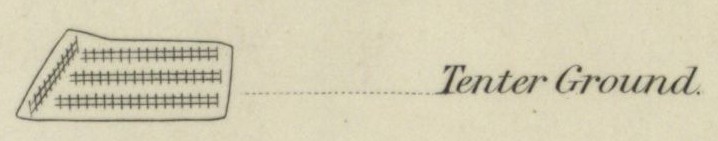
Marking for a "Tenter Ground", in the Ordnance Survey Characteristic Sheet (key) for the Engraved Six-Inch Maps of Great Britain, from 1897.

A tenterground, tenter ground or teneter-field was an area used for drying newly manufactured cloth after fulling. The wet cloth was hooked onto frames called "tenters" and stretched taut using "tenter hooks", so that the cloth would dry flat and square.

It is from this process that we have the expression "on tenterhooks", meaning in a state of nervous tension.

There were tentergrounds wherever cloth was made, and as a result the word "tenter" is found in place names throughout the United Kingdom and its empire, for example several streets in Spitalfields, London and Tenterfield House in Haddington, East Lothian, Scotland, which in turn gave its name to Tenterfield in New South Wales, Australia.

== London ==
The Spitalfields Tenterground was established in the 17th century by Flemish weavers, who were Huguenot refugees fleeing religious persecution. Their weaving industry led to the area becoming a centre of the garment industry (the rag trade as it became known colloquially), with names such as Fashion Street and Petticoat Lane still extant.

It was originally an area of open ground about 150 yards square, surrounded by the weavers' houses and workshops in White's Row, Wentworth Street, Bell Lane and Rose Lane (the last of which no longer exists).

By the 19th century, the Flemish weavers had dispersed, and in 1829 the Tenterground was developed for housing. From about 1850, it was populated by Dutch Jews (see Chuts), to be joined later by Jewish refugees fleeing persecution in eastern Europe (see pogrom).

During the early part of the 20th century, the Tenterground was largely demolished for redevelopment, but some old buildings remain in and around the area, including Flemish weavers' houses and an early Dutch synagogue which was formerly a Huguenot chapel. Another former Huguenot chapel is now a mosque.

Rocque's 1746 map shows further tenter grounds between Bishopsgate and Moorfields, adjoining "Mr Witanoom's Vinegar Yard" (i.e. Cornelius Wittenoom), and also covering large areas of Southwark. Lower Moor Fields, east of Finsbury, connected to Long Alley northwards, was a cloth washing area with cloth pegged to the ground to be stretched and dried.

The 1520 (early Tudor) map of London in layersoflondon.org shows a strip of land marked Tenter ground, between Cripplegate and Moorgate, with another behind The Bell Inn, immediately to the north
