= Feynman sprinkler =

Physics problem popularized by Richard Feynman

Comparison of a regular sprinkler (1) and a reverse sprinkler (2)

A Feynman sprinkler, also referred to as a Feynman inverse sprinkler or reverse sprinkler, is a sprinkler-like device which is submerged in a tank and made to suck the surrounding fluid in. The question of how such a device would turn was the subject of an intense and remarkably long-lived debate. The device generally remains steady with no rotation, though with sufficiently low friction and high rate of inflow, it has been seen to turn weakly in the opposite direction of a conventional sprinkler.

A regular sprinkler has nozzles arranged at angles on a freely rotating wheel such that when water is pumped out of them, the resulting jets cause the wheel to rotate; a Catherine wheel and the aeolipile ("Hero's engine") work on the same principle. A "reverse" or "inverse" sprinkler would operate by aspirating the surrounding fluid instead. The problem is commonly associated with theoretical physicist Richard Feynman, who mentions it in his bestselling memoirs Surely You're Joking, Mr. Feynman!. The problem did not originate with Feynman, nor did he publish a solution to it.

== History ==
Illustration 153a from Ernst Mach's Mechanik (1883): When the hollow rubber ball is squeezed, air flows in the direction of the short arrows and the wheel turns in the direction of the long arrow. When the rubber ball is released, the direction of the flow of the air is reversed but Mach observed "no distinct rotation" of the device.

The first documented treatment of the problem is in chapter III, section III, of Ernst Mach's textbook The Science of Mechanics, first published in 1883. There Mach reported that the device showed "no distinct rotation." In the early 1940s (and apparently without awareness of Mach's earlier discussion), the problem began to circulate among members of the physics department at Princeton University, generating a lively debate. Richard Feynman, at the time a young graduate student at Princeton, built a makeshift experiment within the facilities of the university's cyclotron laboratory. The experiment ended with the explosion of the glass carboy that he was using as part of his setup.

In 1966, Feynman turned down an offer from the editor of Physics Teacher to discuss the problem in print and objected to it being called "Feynman's problem," pointing instead to the discussion of it in Mach's textbook. The sprinkler problem attracted a great deal of attention after the incident was mentioned in Surely You're Joking, Mr. Feynman!, a book of autobiographical reminiscences published in 1985. Feynman gave one argument for why the sprinkler should rotate in the forward direction, and another for why it should rotate in reverse; he did not say how or if the sprinkler actually moved. In an article written shortly after Feynman's death in 1988, John Wheeler, who had been his doctoral advisor at Princeton, revealed that the experiment at the cyclotron had shown "a little tremor as the pressure was first applied [...] but as the flow continued there was no reaction." The sprinkler incident is also discussed in James Gleick's biography of Feynman, Genius, published in 1992 where Gleick claims that a sprinkler will not turn at all if made to suck in fluid.

In 2005, physicist Edward Creutz (who was in charge of the Princeton cyclotron at the time of the incident) revealed in print that he had assisted Feynman in setting up his experiment and that, when pressure was applied to force water out of the carboy through the sprinkler head,

There was a little tremor, as [Feynman] called it, and the sprinkler head rapidly moved back to its original position and stayed there. The water flow continued with the sprinkler stationary. We adjusted the pressure to increase the water flow, about five separate times, and the sprinkler did not move, although water was flowing freely through it in the backwards direction [...] The carboy then exploded, due to the internal pressure. A janitor then appeared and helped me clean up the shattered glass and mop up the water. I don't know what [Feynman] had expected to happen, but my vague thoughts of a time reversal phenomenon were as shattered as the carboy.

== The question ==
In his book, Feynman recites the question:

The problem: You have an S-shaped lawn sprinkler–an S-shaped pipe on a pivot –and the water squirts out at right angles to the axis and makes it spin in a certain direction. Everybody knows which way it goes around; it backs away from the outgoing water. Now the question is this: If you had a lake, or swimming pool–a big supply of water–and you put the sprinkler completely under water, and sucked the water in, instead of squirting it out, which way would it turn? Would it turn the same way as it does when you squirt water out into the air, or would it turn the other way?

== Solution ==
The behavior of the reverse sprinkler is qualitatively quite distinct from that of the ordinary sprinkler, and one does not behave like the other "played backwards". Most of the published theoretical treatments of this problem have concluded that the ideal reverse sprinkler will not experience any torque in its steady state. It may be understood in terms of conservation of angular momentum: in its steady state, the amount of angular momentum carried by the incoming fluid is constant, which implies that there is no torque on the sprinkler itself.

Alternatively, in terms of forces on an individual sprinkler nozzle, consider Mach's illustration. There:

- the reaction force on the nozzle as it sucks in the fluid, pulling the nozzle anti-clockwise;
- the inflowing water impacting on the inside of the nozzle, pushing the nozzle clockwise.

The two forces are equal and opposite, so sucking in the fluid causes no net force on the sprinkler nozzle. This is similar to the pop pop boat when it sucks in water—the inflowing water transfers its momentum to the boat, so sucking in water causes no net force on the boat.

Many experiments, going back to Mach, find no rotation of the reverse sprinkler. In setups with sufficiently low friction and high rate of inflow, the reverse sprinkler has been seen to turn weakly in the opposite sense to the conventional sprinkler, even in its steady state. Such behavior could be explained by the diffusion of momentum in a non-ideal (i.e., viscous) flow. However, careful observation of experimental setups shows that this turning is associated with the formation of a vortex inside the body of the sprinkler. An analysis of the actual distribution of forces and pressure in a non-ideal reverse sprinkler provides the theoretical basis to explain this:

Differences in the regions over which internal and external forces act constitute a force-couple with different moment arms consistent with reverse rotation... the resulting flow-field asymmetry developed downstream from the sprinkler-arm bends supports the role of vortices in reverse sprinkler rotation by suggesting a mechanism for generating vortices in a consistent direction.
