= Tenterhook =

Hooked nail for use in a tenterframe

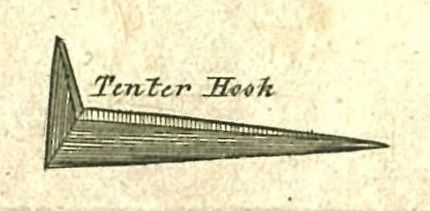
Tenter hook in an 1822 trade catalogue, published by H. Barns & Sons, of Birmingham, England

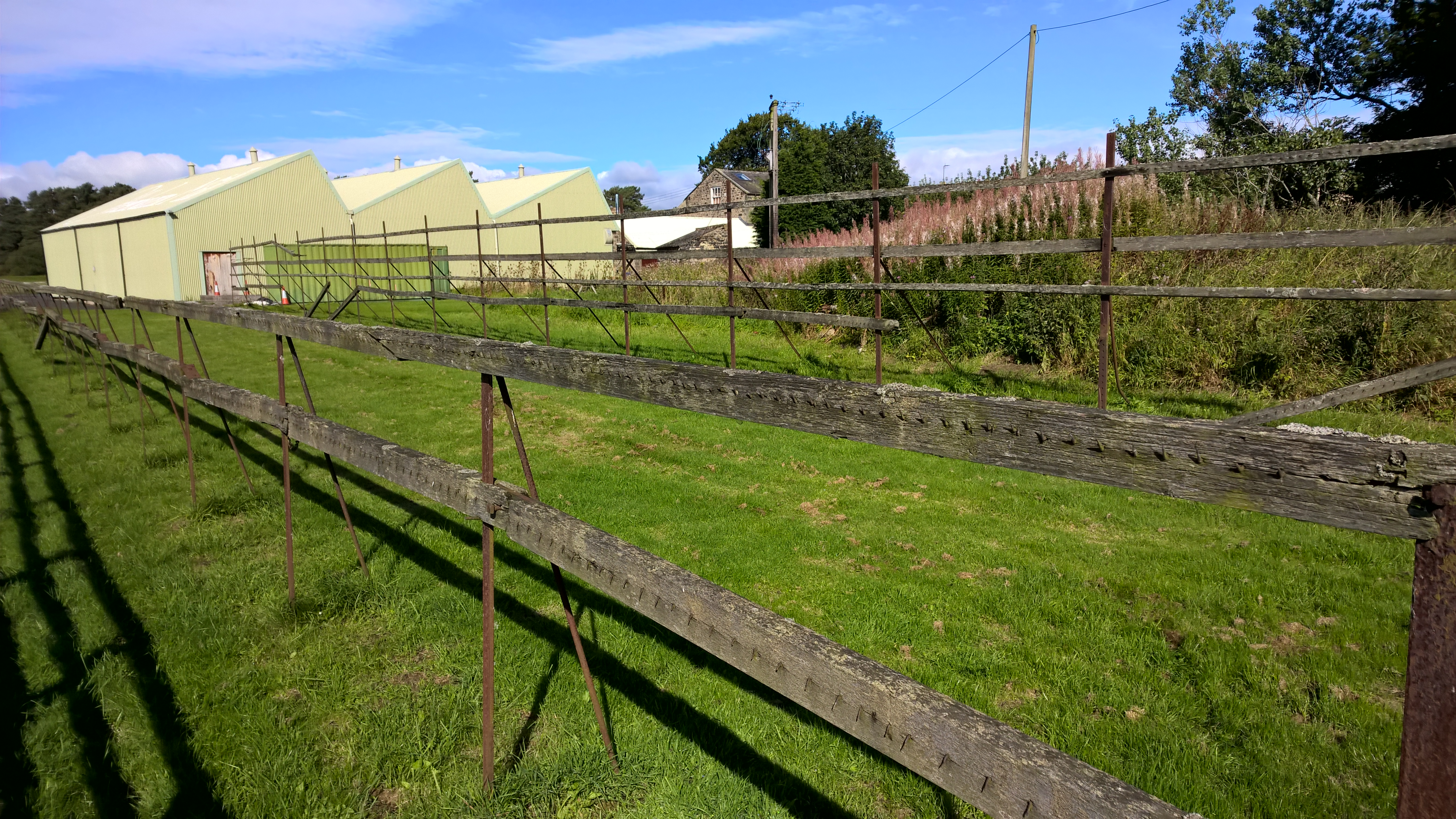
Tenterhooks on what may be the world's last remaining 18th-century tenter frames at the former textile mill Otterburn Mill, Northumberland (2015).

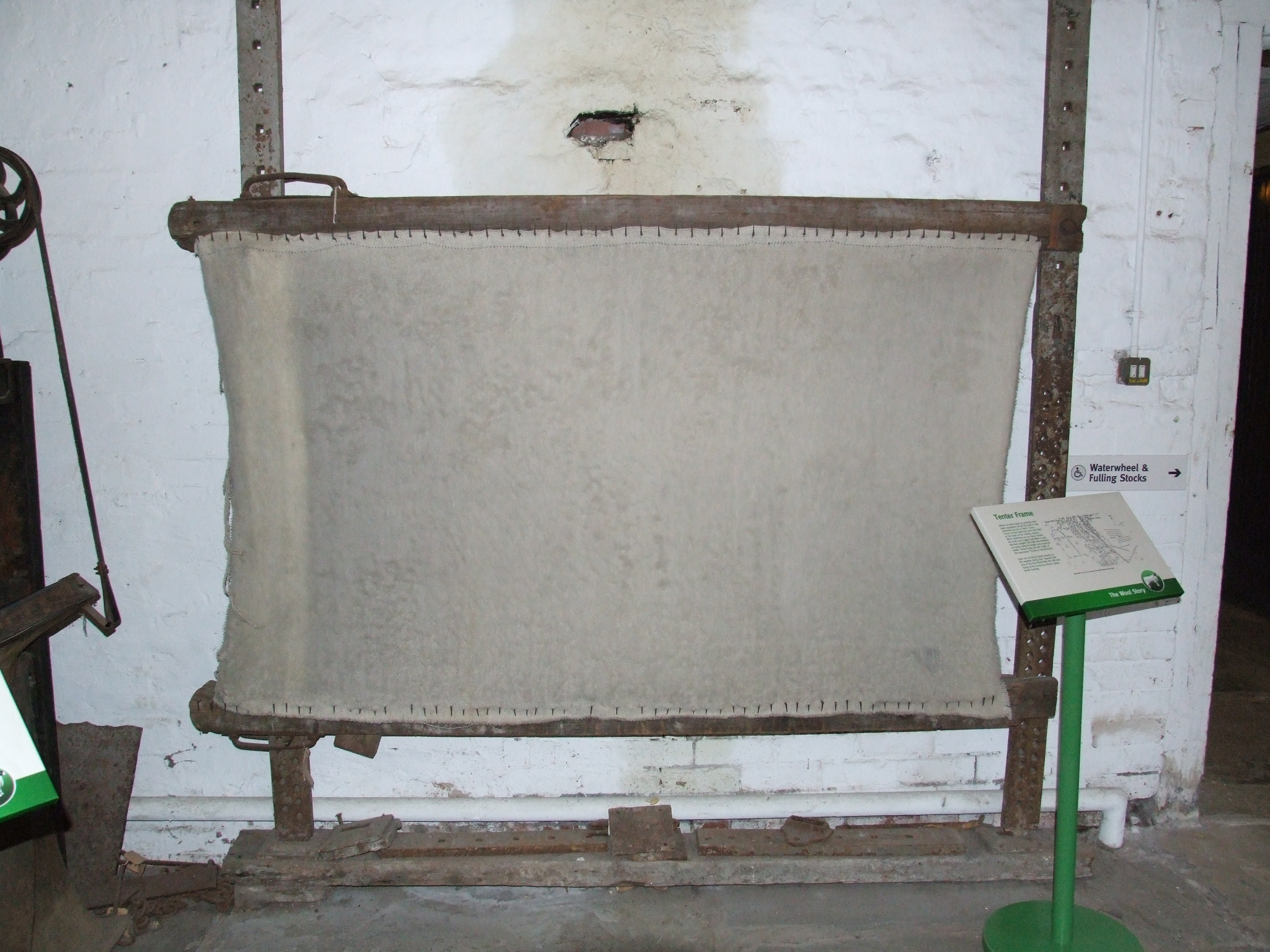
Wool cloth stretched on tenterhooks on a tenterframe

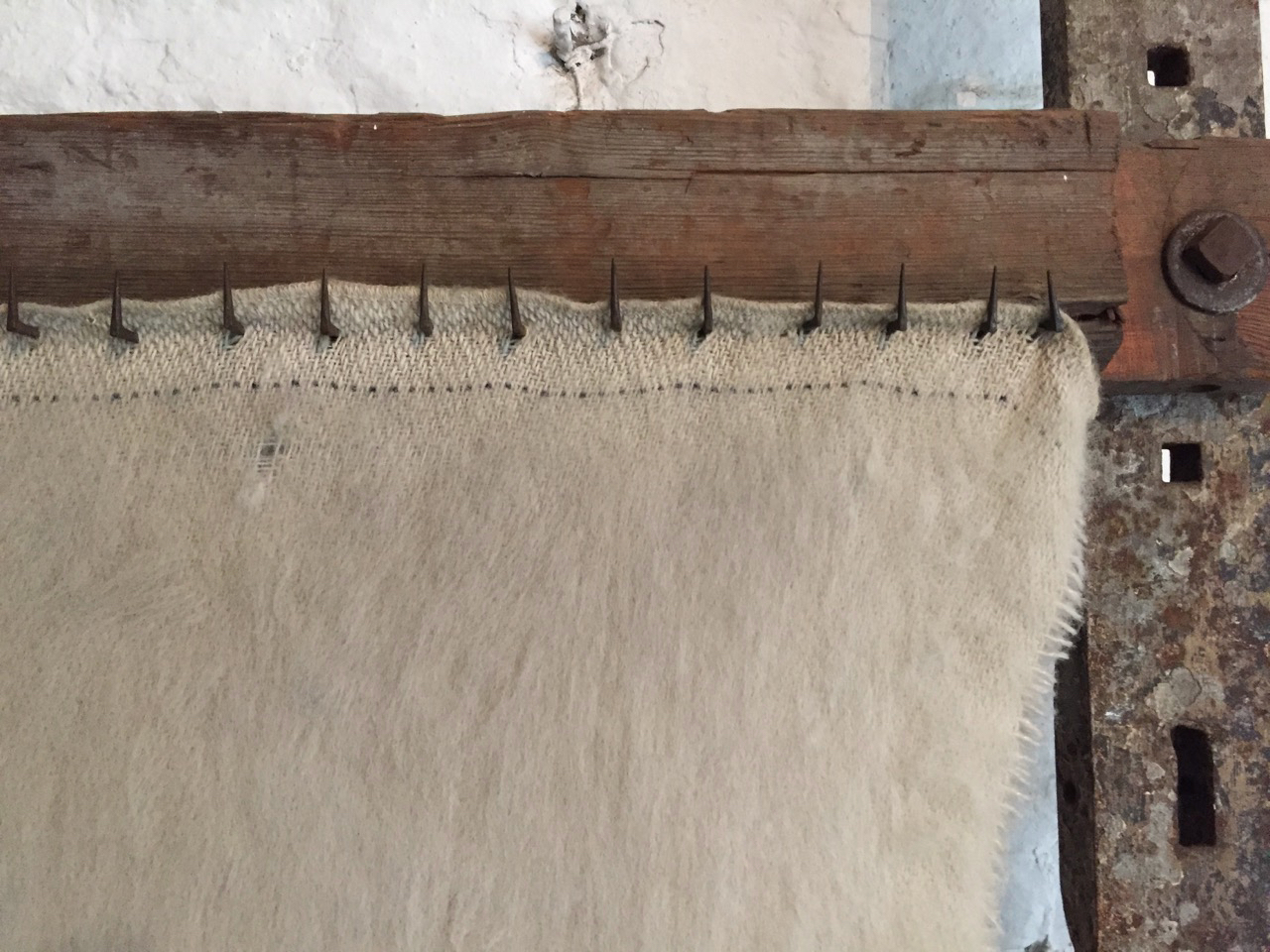
Close-up

Tenterhooks or tenter hooks are hooked nails used with a device known as a tenter, a wooden frame, used since at least the 14th century in the process of making woolen cloth, over which wet cloth would be stretched to prevent shrinkage as it dried, but now superseded by the stenter in the textile manufacturing industry.

The phrase "on tenterhooks" has become a metaphor for nervous anticipation.

== Cloth-making ==
After a piece of cloth was woven, it still contained oil and dirt from the fleece; A craftsman known as a fuller (in Scotland, Scots: tucker, waulker), cleaned the woollen cloth in a fulling mill, and thereafter dried it without allowing the fabric to shrink. To this end, the fuller stretched the wet cloth over a large wooden frame, called a tenter (from Latin tendere 'to stretch'), leaving it to dry outdoors. The lengths of wet cloth were stretched on the tenter using tenterhooks, hooked nails made with a long shank that was driven into the wooden tenter frame around its perimeter, on which the selvedges were fixed so that the cloth would retain its shape and size as it dried.

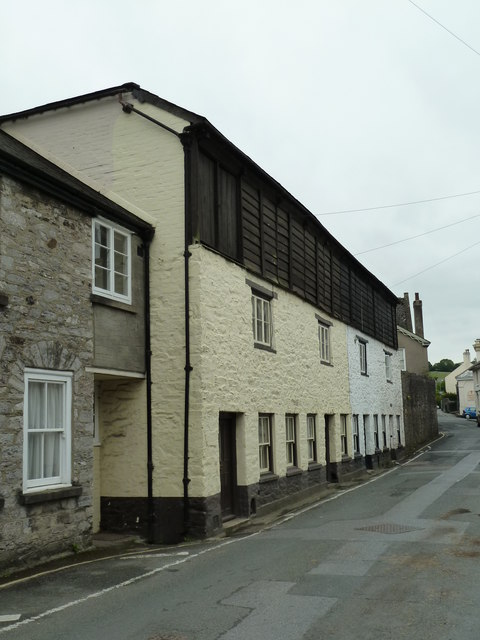
Weavers' cottages at 26-29, Chapel Street, Buckfastleigh, Devon. The top floor comprises a row of tenter lofts.

Historically there were tentergrounds (alternatively, tenter-fields), large open spaces full of tenters, wherever cloth was made, and as a result the word "tenter" is found in place names throughout the United Kingdom and its former colonial possessions, for example several streets in Spitalfields, London, and Tenterfield House in Haddington, East Lothian, Scotland, which in turn gave its name to Tenterfield in New South Wales, Australia. Alternatively, tenters could be indoors, such as in the louvred tenter lofts of the Grade II* listed weavers' cottages in Buckfastleigh, Devon.

The word tenter is still used today to refer to production line machinery employed to stretch polyester films and similar fabrics. The spelling stenter is also found.

== Metaphor ==
By the mid-18th century, the phrase on tenterhooks came to mean being in a state of tension, uneasiness, anxiety, or suspense, i.e., figuratively stretched like the cloth on the tenter.

John Ford's 1633 play Broken Heart contains the lines: "There is no faith in woman. Passion, O, be contain'd! My very heart-strings Are on the tenters."

In 1690 the periodical The General History of Europe used the term in the modern sense: "The mischief is, they will not meet again these two years, so that all business must hang upon the tenterhooks till then."

In 1826, English periodical Monthly magazine or British register of literature, sciences, and the belles-lettres contained the line "I hope (though the wish is a cruel one) that my fair readers, if any such readers have deigned to follow me thus far, are on tenterhooks to know to whom the prize was adjudged." In a letter to his wife the same year, American educator Francis Wayland (waiting for his promised appointment as President of Brown University) wrote "I was never so much on tenter hooks before."

The misuse of "on tender hooks" instead of "on tenterhooks" is one of the most misused English phrases, or eggcorns, according to a 2017 survey of two thousand British adults, ranking in fifth place.
