= Gluhareff Pressure Jet =

Type of jet engine with no moving parts

The Gluhareff Pressure Jet (or tip jet) is a type of jet engine that, like a valveless pulse jet, has no moving parts. It was invented by Eugene Michael Gluhareff, a Russian-American engineer who envisioned it as a power plant for personal helicopters and compact aircraft such as microlights.

== Mechanism ==
The Gluhareff pressure jet operates three acoustically tuned input stages which accelerate and direct air into the combustion chamber where it heats the fuel pressure coil.

Having no moving parts, the engine works by having a coiled pipe in the combustion chamber that superheats the fuel (propane) before being injected into the air-fuel inlet. In the combustion chamber, the fuel/air mixture ignites and burns, creating thrust as it leaves through the exhaust pipe. Induction and compression of the fuel/air mixture is done both by the pressure of propane as it is injected, along with the sound waves created by combustion acting on the intake stacks.

The engine has three intake stages, which are sized according to the sound created by the combustion process when running. This has exactly the same effect as the turbine and compressor in a turbojet, creating a vacuum that sucks in air. The intakes, along with the exhaust, are sonically tuned so that the locations of the pressure antinodes of the Mach disks in the propane stream match the locations of the intake apertures. Thus atmospheric pressure augments air intake as much as possible. Early prototypes produced very small amounts of thrust, before Gluharev developed it from early experiments on producing thrust from using the pressurized fuel's kinetic energy to suck in the air and compress it prior to combustion.

A 1949 reference to a very similar concept exists. Although described as a ram jet, this version heats the fuel within a closed space to create the pressure for injection and compression of the entrained air in a similar manner to the Gluhareff design and is in all fundamental respects a pressure jet of the same type.

== Advantages ==
- No moving parts, meaning very little wear.
- Simple throttling, via a valve in the fuel line.
- Clean burning and very low emissions, especially as it is designed to use propane which burns very cleanly.
- It is possible that the engine can be built at home from plans or a kit. These are already commercially available kits.
- Simple design means that engines can be incorporated into either a helicopter's rotor blades or a fixed-wing aircraft's wings or tailfins.

== Disadvantages ==
- Engines need to be sonically tuned for maximum efficiency.
- Noise is very similar to that of a pulse jet engine, which could cause discomfort for passengers and people on the ground.
- Very high engine temperatures are a problem (the engine can glow bright orange which creates an obvious material problem).
- Difficult to mount due to operating temperatures, intake valve assembly, and fuel supply.

== Applications ==
- Gluhareff EMG-300
- Wheeling PJ1

== See also ==
- Valveless pulsejet
- Pulsejet
- Pulse detonation engine
- Jet engine
- Rocket engine
