= Wheeling PJ1 =

American jet-powered homebuilt airplane

- Press release image of the Wheeling PJ1

General information
- Type: Homebuilt aircraft
- National origin: United States
- Manufacturer: Wheeling Aircraft Co.
- Number built: 1

History
- Introduction date: 1982

The Wheeling PJ1 was an American single seat homebuilt aircraft equipped with two pulse-jet engines.

== Design and development ==
The PJ1 was designed and built by Douglas S. Wheeling of Pontiac, Michigan. The aircraft was a low-wing monoplane, with a fixed tricycle undercarriage. The fuselage was of simple design, with the pilot located under a bubble canopy. The wings had no dihedral and had a slightly tapered planform. Cylindrical fuel-tanks were located at the wingtips. Two tailfins were located at the tail of the fuselage.

The aircraft's most notable feature was its propulsion, supplied by two Gluhareff pulse jet engines, mounted to the rear of the canopy. One contemporary image shows the engines positioned close together, on struts rising from the fuselage. Another image shows them on struts which cant inwards from the wing.

== Operational history ==
Wheeling obtained the FAA registration of N17PJ for the aircraft in May 1980. The PJ1 was shown in a semi-completed state at the 1982 EAA Oshkosh airshow, however it is not known if the aircraft was subsequently completed, or if any flights had been made with it.

== Specifications ==
Data from Minijets

General characteristics

- Crew: 1
- Max takeoff weight: 661 lb (300 kg) with internal fuel only
- Powerplant: 2 × Gluhareff G8-2-130R pulse jets

Performance

- Maximum speed: 300 kn (340 mph, 550 km/h)

== See also ==
Aircraft of comparable role, configuration, and era

- Bede-5J jet
- Colomban Cri-cri Jet
- Sonex Aircraft SubSonex
