= Eugene Michael Gluhareff =

Eugene Michael Gluhareff (April 5, 1916 – July 15, 1994) was born in Petrograd (now known as St. Petersburg), Russia and moved to the United States in 1924. Gluhareff was an engineer, the son of Michael Gluhareff of Sikorsky Aircraft. He is much acclaimed for his pioneering work on tip jets, inventor of the Gluhareff Pressure Jet and was a contributor to the American Helicopter XH-26 Jet Jeep.

== Early life ==
Eugene M. Gluhareff was born in St. Petersburg, Russia in 1916, was the oldest of two children, born to Michael E. Gluhareff and Antonina Gluhareff. His father, Michael E. Gluhareff was an aircraft engineer who was a former Chief engineer at the Sikorsky Aircraft division of the United Aircraft Corporation, who graduated from the Russian Imperial Military Engineering College (now known as the Saint Petersburg Military Engineering-Technical University).

Gluhareff graduated from the Rensselaer Polytechnic Institute in 1944 with a Bachelor of Sciences in Aeronautical Engineering. Immediately after his graduation, Gluhareff went to work at Sikorsky Aircraft Corporation in Bridgeport, Connecticut; where he worked under Igor A. Sikorsky.

== Career ==
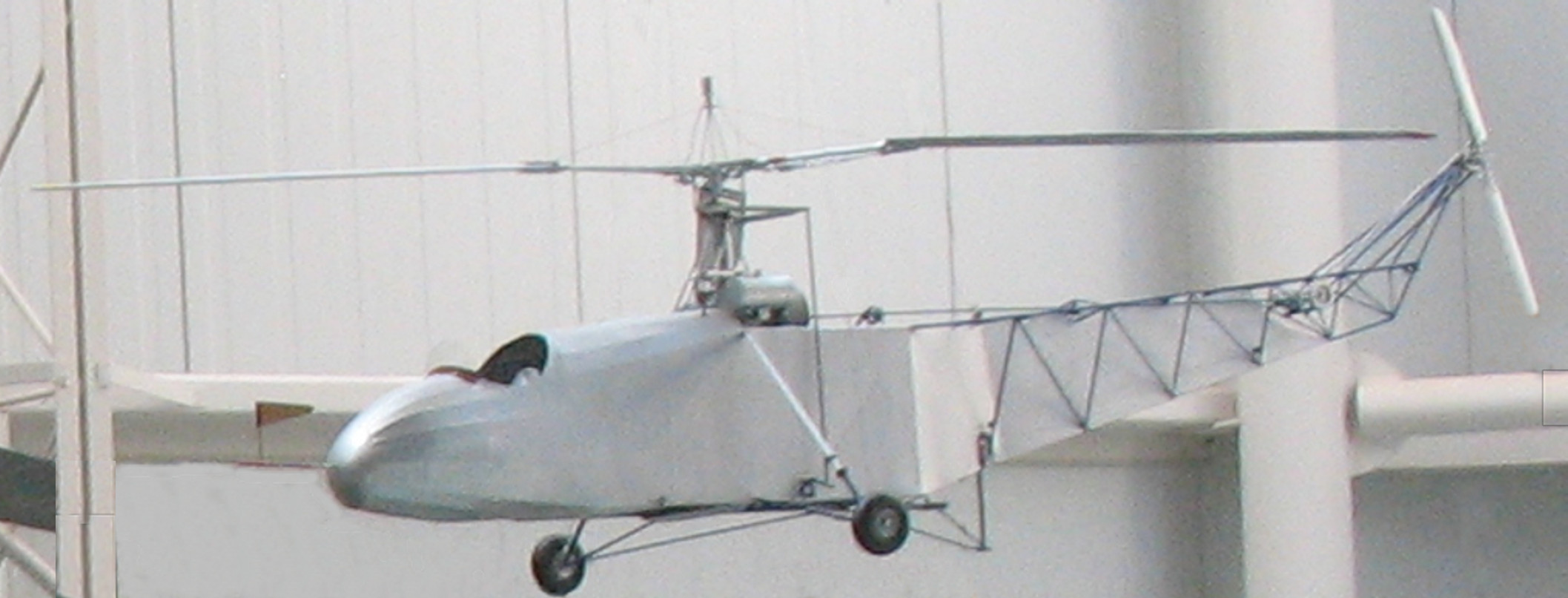
One of the early projects Gluhareff was involved in was the VS-300 helicopter

Gluhareff began his career at the Sikorsky Aircraft Corporation in 1944, one of the initial projects he worked on included the VS-300 and the R-4 helicopters. Gluhareff began working on the Pulse Jet Engine in 1947 for Sikorsky.

In 1950, Gluhareff moved to California in order to work with the company, American Helicopter. One of the helicopters he worked on during the early 1950s was the XA-5 "Top Sergeant", a valved pulse-jet powered helicopter. In 1953, after working on several other projects, Gluhareff founded the Gluhareff Helicopters Corporation.

Gluhareff began working with the U.S. Navy in order to develop Rotary Drones in 1960. In 1964, Gluhareff joined the Douglas Aircraft Company, where he worked as a Design Engineer Scientist in the development of the S-4 stage of the Saturn Rocket which was part of the Apollo program. Gluhareff continued to work with the company, as it became the McDonnell Douglas company, where he eventually became a specialist in rocket stabilization system designing used for ejection seats and capsules.

Gluhareff returned to EMG Engineering, his own company in 1972, where he continued working until his death, one of the last projects he worked on was the EMG-300, also known as the "Flying Motorcycle", which was designed in the early 1990s.

== Death ==
Gluhareff died due to illness whilst he was working on the production and marketing stage of the EMG-300 helicopter in 1994.

== See also ==
- List of Russian inventors
