= Gluhareff EMG-300 =

EMG-300

General information
- Type: Tip jet helicopter
- Designer: Eugene Michael Gluhareff
- Number built: 1

History
- Retired: 1994

The Gluhareff EMG-300 is a single-seat helicopter with a rotor powered by tip jet engines. It was designed and built by Eugene Michael Gluhareff in the 1990s. Although some test flights took place, Gluhareff died in 1994 before development was completed.

The helicopter has a two-blade rotor; each blade has a Gluhareff Pressure Jet engine mounted on its tip. Only one was built; it is now in the collection of the Pima Air & Space Museum in Tucson, Arizona.

== See also ==
- List of single seat helicopters
