= Tenterfield House =

- Interactive map of the Tenterfield House area

General information
- Type: House
- Location: Dunbar Road, Haddington, East Lothian, Scotland
- Coordinates: 55.9584°N 2.7769°W
- Completed: 18th century
- Renovated: 1995 (converted to apartments)

Design and construction
- Designations: Category B listed

Tenterfield House is a category B listed building in Dunbar Road, Haddington, East Lothian, Scotland. It was built in the 18th century as a two-storey private residence. A three-story wing with tower was added circa 1860. The house was used as a Christie Home for orphans until 1950, then a local authority children's home until 1992. It was converted into apartments in 1995.

The house was once owned by Sir Stuart Donaldson, the first Premier of the Colony of New South Wales, Australia, who in the mid nineteenth century gave its name to his property, Tenterfield Station, in New South Wales and thus to the town of Tenterfield, and through that to the Tenterfield Oration, the speech which led ultimately to the federation of Australia.

The building was given category B listed status in December 1977, affording it legal protection from unauthorised alteration from demolition.

The adjacent Tenterfield Cottage was destroyed by fire in July 2011. It was empty and proposed for demolition at the time.

The name "Tenterfield" refers to a tenter field.
