= Hot air (economics) =

Hot air in economics refers to the Assigned Amount Units (AAU) credits given for the reduction of Green House Gas (GHG) emissions among the former Soviet Bloc countries since 1990.

The fall of the Soviet Union led to massive restructuring and deindustrialization of many of the former Soviet Bloc. When the Kyoto Protocol was negotiated, there were several mechanisms that allowed for trading of emissions credits. These included credits produced under the Joint Initiative (JI) provision: Emission Reduction Unit credits; the Clean Development Mechanism (CDM): Certified Emission Reduction credits; and Assigned Amount Units (AAU) now also widely known as Hot Air in the post Soviet context. These were given to Russia as an incentive to sign the treaty. Critical climate change experts decry these credits as a way for countries to buy their way out of taking action to address climate change.
