= Hot air oven =

Electrical device which uses dry heat to sterilize substances

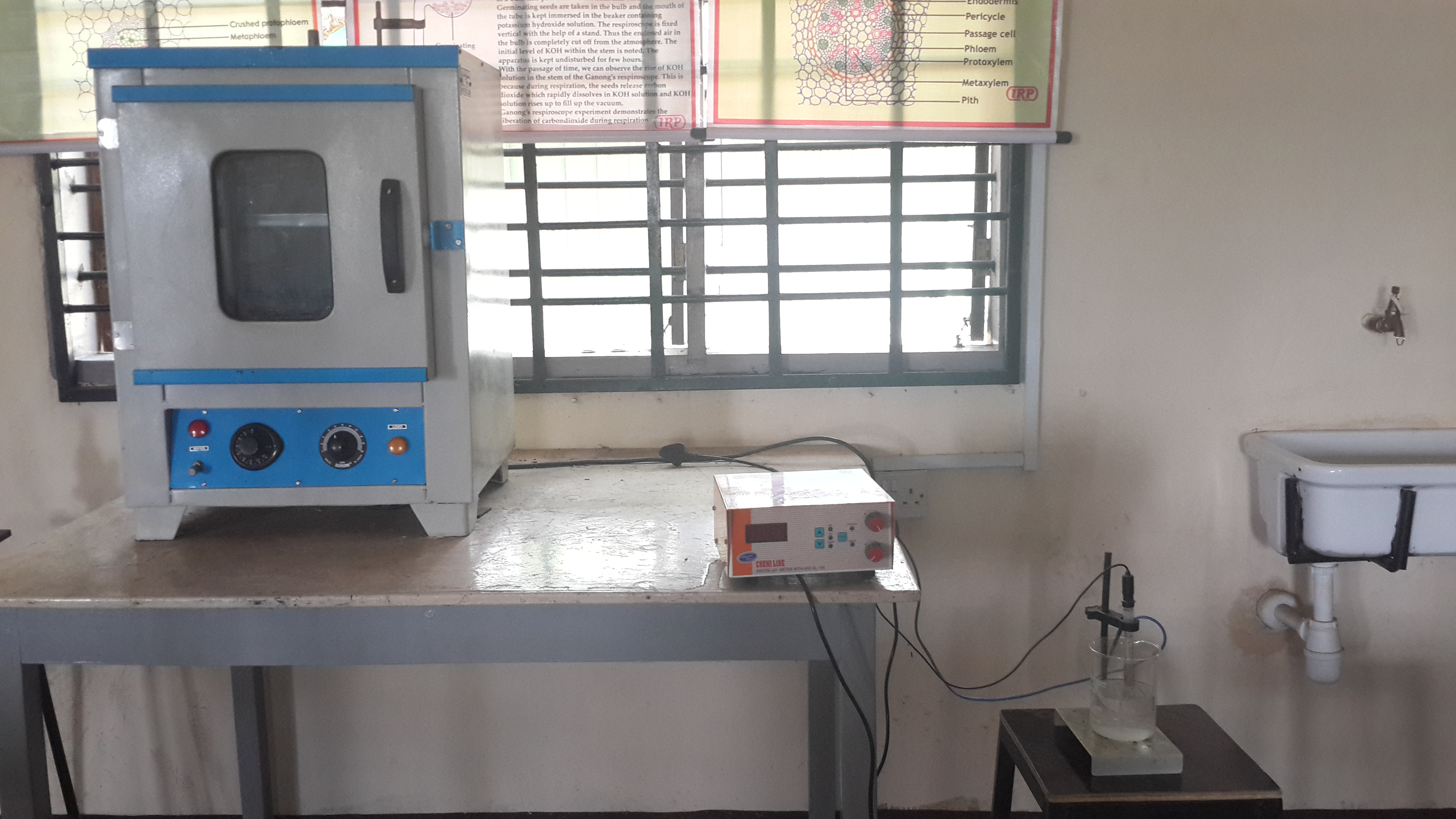
Hot air oven

Hot air ovens are electrical devices which use dry heat to sterilize. They were originally developed by Louis Pasteur, and are essentially the same as fan ovens used for cooking food. Generally, they use a thermostat to control the temperature. Their double walled insulation keeps the heat in and conserves energy, the inner layer being a poor conductor and outer layer being metallic. There is also an air filled space in between to aid insulation. An air circulating fan helps in uniform distribution of the heat. These are fitted with the adjustable wire mesh plated trays or aluminium trays and may have an on/off rocker switch, as well as indicators and controls for temperature and holding time. The capacities of these ovens vary. Power supply needs vary from country to country, depending on the voltage and frequency (hertz) used. Temperature sensitive tapes or biological indicators using bacterial spores can be used as controls, to test for the efficacy of the device during use.

== Advantages and disadvantages ==
They do not require water and there is not much pressure build up within the oven, unlike an autoclave, making them safer to work with. This also makes them more suitable to be used in a laboratory environment. They are much smaller than autoclaves but can still be as effective. They can be more rapid than an autoclave and higher temperatures can be reached compared to other means. As they use dry heat instead of moist heat, some pathogens like prions, may not be killed by them every time, based on the principle of thermal inactivation by oxidation.

== Usage ==
A complete cycle involves heating the oven to the required temperature, maintaining that temperature for the proper time interval for that temperature, turning the machine off and cooling the articles in the closed oven till they reach room temperature. The standard settings for a hot air oven are:

- 1.5 to 2 hours at 160 °C (320 °F)
- 6 to 12 minutes at 190 °C (374 °F)

....plus the time required to preheat the chamber before beginning the sterilization cycle. If the door is opened before time, heat escapes and the process becomes incomplete. Thus the cycle must be properly repeated all over.

These are widely used to sterilize articles that can withstand high temperatures and not get burnt, like glassware and powders. Linen gets burnt and surgical sharps lose their sharpness.
