= Valveless pulsejet =

Simplest known jet propulsion device

Working mechanism of a valveless pulsejet engine. The basic idea is that the column of air in the long exhaust pipe functions like the piston of a reciprocating engine. From another point of view, the engine is an acoustic resonator internally excited by resonating combustions in the chamber. The chamber acts as a pressure antinode which is compressed by the returning wave. The intake pipe acts as a kinematic antinode which sucks and exhausts gas. Note the longer length of the exhaust pipe—this is important as it prevents oxygen from entering the wrong way and igniting the system the wrong way. It does this because when the pulse ignites, there is still some exhaust gas in the exhaust pipe. That is sucked in before any additional oxygen is sucked in. Of course, the air intake pipe has already supplied the oxygen by that point and the pulse reignites.

A valveless pulsejet (or pulse jet) is the simplest known jet propulsion device. Valveless pulsejets are low in cost, light weight, powerful and easy to operate. They have all the advantages (and most of the disadvantages) of conventional valved pulsejets, but without the reed valves that need frequent replacement; a valveless pulsejet can operate for its entire useful life with practically zero maintenance. They have been used to power model aircraft, experimental go-karts, and unmanned military aircraft such as cruise missiles and target drones.

== Basic characteristics ==
A pulsejet engine is an air-breathing reaction engine that employs an ongoing sequence of discrete combustion events rather than one sustained combustion event. This clearly distinguishes it from other reaction engine types such as rockets, turbojets, and ramjets, which are all constant combustion devices. All other reaction engines are driven by maintaining high internal pressure; pulsejets are driven by an alternation between high and low pressure. This alternation is not maintained by any mechanical contrivance, but rather by the natural acoustic resonance of the rigid tubular engine structure. The valveless pulsejet is, mechanically speaking, the simplest form of pulsejet, and is, in fact, the simplest known air-breathing propulsion device that can operate "statically", i.e. without forward motion.

The combustion events driving a pulsejet are often informally called explosions; however, the correct term is deflagrations. They are not detonations, which is the combustion event in pulse detonation engines (PDEs). The deflagration within the combustion zone of a pulsejet is characterized by a sudden rise in temperature and pressure followed by a rapid subsonic expansion in gas volume. It is this expansion that performs the main work of moving air rearward through the device as well as setting up conditions in the main tube for the cycle to continue.

A pulsejet engine works by alternately accelerating a contained mass of air rearward and then breathing in a fresh mass of air to replace it. The energy to accelerate the air mass is provided by the deflagration of fuel mixed thoroughly into the newly acquired fresh air mass. This cycle is repeated many times per second. During the brief mass acceleration phase of each cycle, the engine's physical action is like that of other reaction engines — gas mass is accelerated rearward, resulting in an application of force forward into the body of the engine. These pulses of force, rapidly repeated over time, comprise the measurable thrust force of the engine.

Some basic differences between valved and valveless pulsejets are:

- Valveless pulsejet engines have no mechanical valve, eliminating the only internal "moving part" of the conventional pulsejet.
- In valveless engines, the intake section has an important role to play throughout the entire pulsejet cycle.
- Valveless engines produce thrust forces in two distinct but synchronized mass acceleration events per cycle, rather than just one.

== Basic (valved) pulsejet theory ==
In a conventional "valved" pulsejet, like the engine of the infamous V-1 "buzz bomb" of World War II, there are two ducts connected to the combustion zone where the deflagrations occur. These are generally known as the "intake" (a very short duct) and the "tailpipe" (a very long duct). The function of the forward-facing intake is to provide air (and in many smaller pulsejets, the fuel/air mixing action) for combustion. The purpose of the rear-facing tailpipe is to provide air mass for acceleration by the explosive blast as well as to direct the accelerated mass totally rearward. The combustion zone (usually a widened "chamber" section) and tailpipe make up the main tube of the engine. A flexible, low mass one-way valve (or multiple identical valves) separates the intake from the combustion zone.

At the beginning of each cycle, air must be pulled into the combustion zone. At the end of each cycle, the tailpipe must be reloaded with air from the surrounding atmosphere. Both of these basic actions are accomplished by a significant drop in pressure that occurs naturally after the deflagration expansion, a phenomenon known as the Kadenacy effect (named after the scientist who first fully described it). This temporary low pressure opens the metal valve and draws in the intake air (or air/fuel mixture). It also causes a reversal of flow in the tailpipe that draws fresh air forward to re-fill the pipe. When the next deflagration occurs, the rapid pressure rise slams the valve shut very quickly, ensuring that almost no explosion mass exits in the forward direction so the expansion of the combustion gases will all be used to accelerate the replenished mass of air in the long tailpipe rearward.

== Valveless pulsejet operation ==
The valveless pulsejet is not really valveless — it just uses the mass of air in the intake tube as its valve, in place of a mechanical valve. It cannot do this without moving the intake air outward, and this volume of air itself has significant mass, just as the air in the tailpipe does — therefore, it is not blown away instantly by the deflagration but is accelerated over a significant fraction of the cycle time. In all known successful valveless pulsejet designs, the intake air mass is a small fraction of the tailpipe air mass (due to the smaller dimensions of the intake duct). This means that the intake air mass will be cleared out of contact with the body of the engine faster than the tailpipe mass will. The carefully designed imbalance of these two air masses is important for the proper timing of all parts of the cycle.

When the deflagration begins, a zone of significantly elevated pressure travels outward through both air masses as a compression wave. This wave moves at the speed of sound through both the intake and tailpipe air masses. (Because these air masses are significantly elevated in temperature as a result of earlier cycles, the speed of sound in them is much higher than it would be in normal outdoor air.) When a compression wave reaches the open end of either tube, a low pressure rarefaction wave starts back in the opposite direction, as if "reflected" by the open end. This low pressure region returning to the combustion zone is, in fact, the internal mechanism of the Kadenacy effect. There will be no "breathing" of fresh air into the combustion zone until the arrival of the rarefaction wave.

The wave motion through the air masses should not be confused with the separate motions of the masses themselves. At the start of deflagration, the pressure wave immediately moves through both air masses, while the gas expansion (due to combustion heat) is just beginning in the combustion zone. The intake air mass will be rapidly accelerated outward behind the pressure wave, because its mass is relatively small. The tailpipe air mass will follow the outgoing pressure wave much more slowly. Also, the eventual flow reversal will take place much sooner in the intake, due to its smaller air mass. The timing of the wave motions is determined basically by the lengths of the intake and main tube of the engine; the timing of mass motions is determined mostly by the volumes and exact shapes of these sections. Both are affected by local gas temperatures.

In the valveless engine, there will actually be two arrivals of rarefaction waves — first, from the intake and then from the tailpipe. In typical valveless designs, the wave that comes back from the intake will be relatively weak. Its main effect is to begin flow reversal in the intake itself, in effect "pre-loading" the intake duct with fresh outdoor air. The actual breathing of the engine as a whole will not begin in earnest until the major low pressure wave from the tailpipe reaches the combustion zone. Once that happens, significant flow reversal begins, driven by the drop in combustion zone pressure.

During this phase, too, there is a difference in action between the very different masses in the intake and tailpipe. The intake air mass is again fairly low, but it now almost totally consists of outside air; therefore, fresh air is available almost immediately to begin re-filling the combustion zone from the front. The tailpipe air mass is also pulled, eventually reversing direction as well. The tailpipe will never be completely purged of hot combustion gases, but at reversal it will be easily able to pull in fresh air from all sides around the tailpipe opening, so its contained mass will be gradually increasing until the next deflagration event. As air flows rapidly into the combustion zone, the rarefaction wave is reflected rearward by the front of the engine body, and as it moves rearward the air density in the combustion zone naturally rises until the pressure of the air/fuel mixture reaches a value where deflagration can again commence.

== Practical design issues ==
In practical designs there is no need for a continuous ignition system — the combustion zone is never totally purged of combustion gases and free radicals, so there is enough chemical action in the residue in the combustion zone to act as an igniter for the next blast once the mixture is up to a reasonable density and pressure: the cycle repeats, controlled only by the synchronization of pressure and flow events in the two ducts.

While it is theoretically possible to have such an engine without a distinct "combustion chamber" larger than the tailpipe diameter, all successful valveless engines designed so far have a widened chamber of some sort, roughly similar to that found in typical valved engine designs. The chamber typically takes up a fairly small fraction of the overall main tube length.

The acceleration of air mass back through the intake duct doesn't make sense for engine thrust if the intake is aimed forward, since the intake thrust is a fairly large fraction of the tailpipe thrust. Various engine geometries have been used to make the thrust forces from the two ducts act in the same direction. One simple method is to turn the engine around and then put a U-bend in the tailpipe, so both ducts are spouting rearward, as in the Ecrevisse and Lockwood (also known as Lockwood-Hiller) types. The Escopette and Kentfield designs use recuperators (U-shaped auxiliary tubes) mounted in front of the front-firing intakes to turn the intake blast and flow rearward. The so-called "Chinese" and Thermojet styles simply mount the intake on the chamber in a rear-spouting direction, leaving the front face of the chamber unbroken. The basic internal operation of the engine with these geometries is no different from that described above, however. The Lockwood is unique in one respect, namely, its very large diameter intake — the thrust from this large tube is no less than 40 percent of the engine thrust as a whole. The tailpipe volume of this design is quite large, though, so the imbalance of the contained masses is still clearly seen.

== "Jam jar jet" design ==
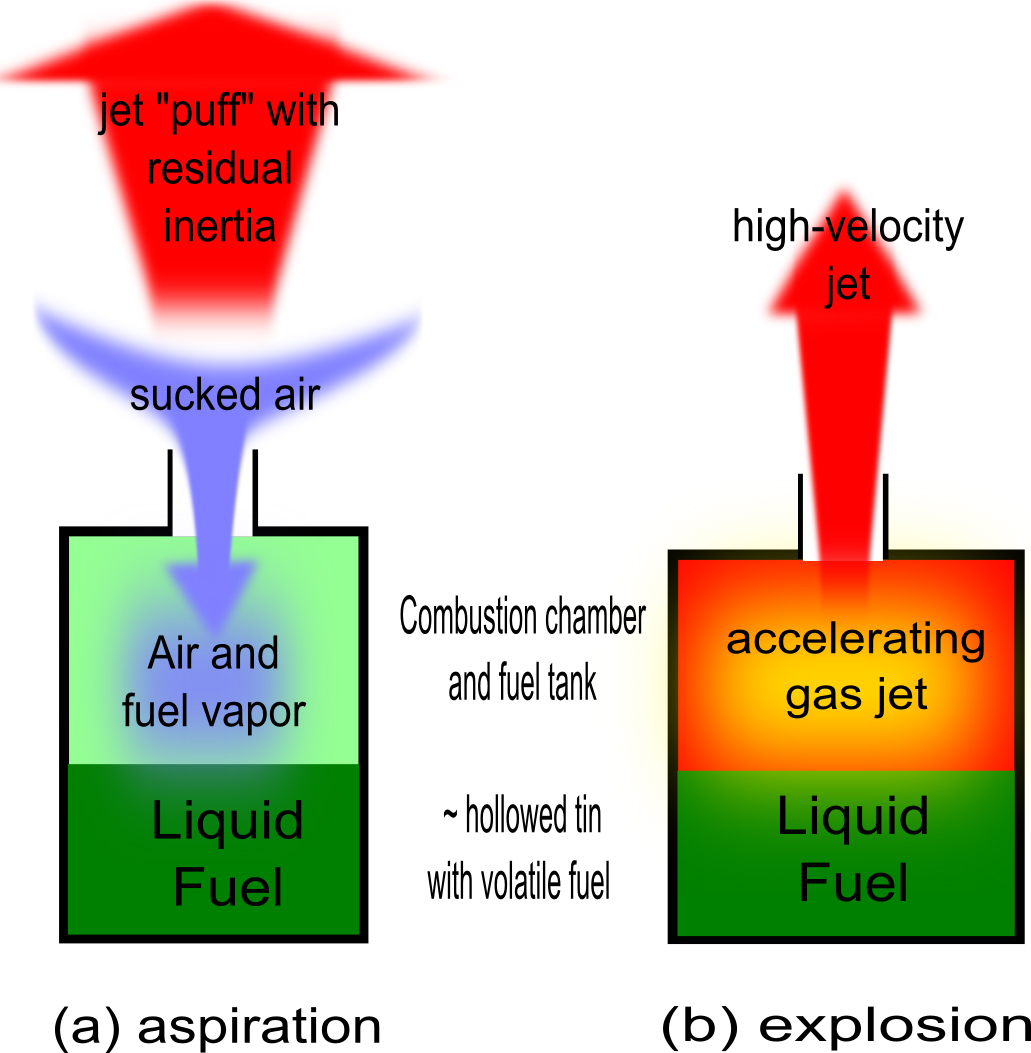
Work mechanism of jam jar jet. (b) Mixture of air and fuel vapors could ignite using external igniter or by residual free radicals from last work cycle. (a) The previous jet expelled more air than conform to equilibrium pressure in chamber, thus some of the fresh air is sucked back. The pressure drop in this case is caused more by cooling of the gas in chamber than by gas momentum. Gas momentum can not be used well in this design because of lack of exhaust (resonator) pipe and very dissipative aerodynamics of the aperture.

Most pulsejet engines use independent intake and exhaust pipes. A physically simpler design combines the intake and exhaust aperture. This is possible due to the oscillating behaviour of a pulse engine. One aperture can act as exhaust pipe during the high-pressure phase of the work cycle and as intake during the aspiration phase. This engine design is less efficient in this primitive form due to its lack of a resonant pipe and thus a lack of reflected compressing and sucking acoustic waves. However it works fairly well with a simple instrument such as jam jar with a pierced lid and fuel inside, hence the name.

Successful versions of the jam jar jet have been run in a plastic bottle. The bottle is far less efficient than the jam jar versions and is unable to sustain a decent jet for more than a few seconds. It is theorized that the alcohol that was used to operate the simple jet was acting as a barrier to stop the heat getting all the way through to the plastic. For the jam jar jet design to work the propellant must be vaporised to ignite which is most often done by a shaking of the jet which causes the propellant to coat the container, therefore giving the theory some validity.

== Pros and cons ==
Successful valveless pulsejets have been built from a few centimeters in length to huge sizes, though the largest and smallest have not been used for propulsion. The smallest ones are only successful when extremely fast-burning fuels are employed (acetylene or hydrogen, for example). Medium and larger sized engines can be made to burn almost any flammable material that can be delivered uniformly to the combustion zone, though of course volatile flammable liquids (gasoline, kerosene, various alcohols) and standard fuel gases (LPG, propane, butane, MAPP gas) are easiest to use. Because of the deflagration nature of pulsejet combustion, these engines are extremely efficient combustors, producing practically no hazardous pollutants, other than CO_{2}, even when using hydrocarbon fuels. With modern high-temperature metals for the main structure, engine weight can be kept extremely low. Without the presence of a mechanical valve, the engines require practically no ongoing maintenance to remain operational.

Up to the present, the physical size of successful valveless designs has always been somewhat larger than valved engines for the same thrust value, though this is theoretically not a requirement. Like valved pulsejets, heat (engines frequently run white hot) and very high operational noise levels (140 decibels is possible) are among the greatest disadvantages of these engines. An ignition system of some sort is required for engine startup. In the smallest sizes, forced air at the intake is also typically needed for startup. There is still much room for improvement in the development of really efficient, fully practical designs for propulsion uses.

One possible solution to the ongoing problem of pulsejet inefficiency would be to have two pulsejets in one, with each blast compressing the mixture of fuel and air in the other, and both ends discharging into a common chamber through which air flows only one way. This could potentially allow much higher compression ratios, better fuel efficiencies, and greater thrust.

== See also ==
- Gluhareff Pressure Jet
- Pulse detonation engine
- Rotating detonation engine
- List of pulsejet-powered aircraft
- Pop pop boat
