= Dry heat sterilization =

Use of dry, hot air to eliminate pathogens

Dry heat sterilization of an object is one of the earliest forms of sterilization practiced. It uses hot air that is either free from water vapor or has very little of it, where this moisture plays a minimal or no role in the process of sterilization.

== Process ==
The dry heat sterilization process is accomplished by conduction; that is where heat is absorbed by the exterior surface of an item and then passed inward to the next layer. Eventually, the entire item reaches the proper temperature needed to achieve sterilization. The proper time and temperature for dry heat sterilization is 150 °C (302 °F) for 150 minutes, 160 °C (320 °F) for 120 minutes or 170 °C (340 °F) for 60 minutes, and in the case of High Velocity Hot Air sterilisers, 190°C (375°F) for 6 to 12 minutes.

Items should be dry before sterilization since water will interfere with the process. Dry heat destroys microorganisms by causing denaturation of proteins.

The presence of moisture, such as in steam sterilization, significantly speeds up heat penetration.

There are two types of hot air convection (Convection refers to the circulation of heated air within the chamber of the oven) sterilizers:

- Gravity convection
- Mechanical convection

=== Mechanical convection process ===
A mechanical convection oven contains a blower that actively forces heated air throughout all areas of the chamber. The flow created by the blower ensures uniform temperatures and the equal transfer of heat throughout the load. For this reason, the mechanical convection oven is the more efficient of the two processes.

=== High Velocity Hot Air ===
An even more efficient system than convection uses deturbulized hot air forced through a jet curtain at 3000ft/minute.

== Instruments used for dry heat sterilization ==
Instruments and techniques used for dry heat sterilization include hot air ovens, incinerators, flaming, radiation, and glass bead sterilizers.

== Effect on microorganisms ==
Dry heat lyses the proteins in any organism, causes oxidative free radical damage, causes drying of cells, and can even burn them to ashes, as in incineration.

== See also ==
- Sterility assurance level
