= Pop pop boat =

Simple toy working on a water jet principle

Video of a pop pop boat in action

A pop-pop boat (also known as a flash-steamer, hot-air-boat, or toc-toc after a German version from the 1920s) is a toy with a simple steam engine without moving parts, typically powered by a candle or vegetable oil burner. The name comes from the noise made by some versions of the boats.

Initially patented in 1891, the concept has undergone a number of changes and subsequent patents.

The engine consists of a boiler and one or more exhaust tubes, in which an oscillation of the water is established in the tubes to eject water out the exhaust tubes in pulses to propel the boat.

== History ==
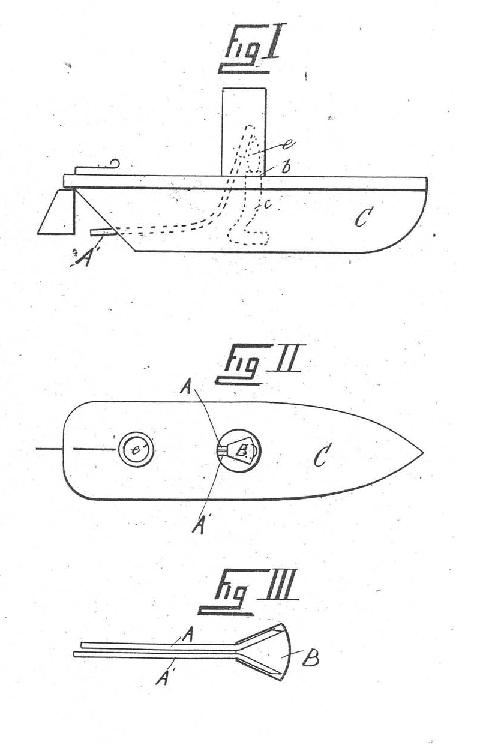
Pop-pop engine design, from a patent application filed by Thomas Piot in 1891

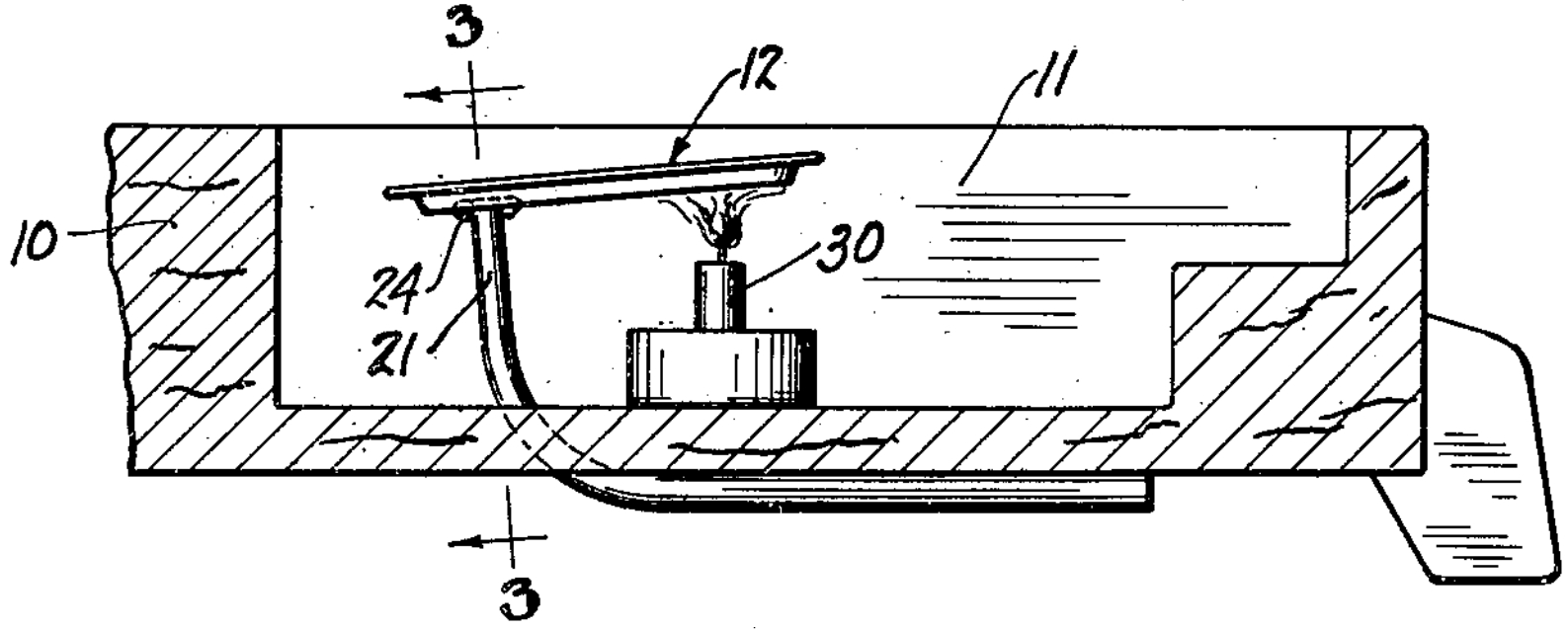
The diaphragm type engine, from a patent application filed by Paul Jones in 1934

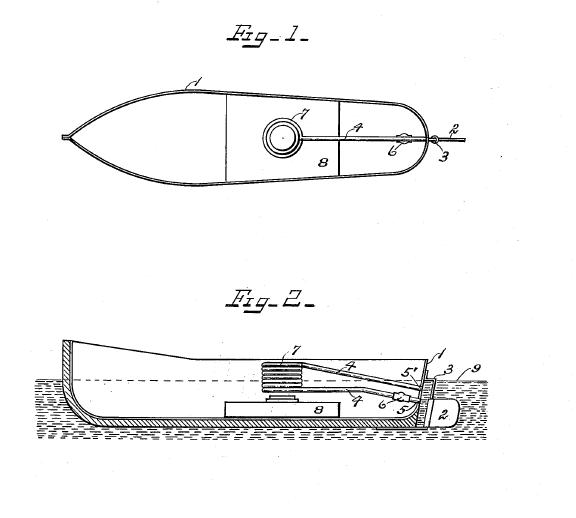
Coil type engine, from a patent application filed by William Purcell in 1920

Credit for the first pop pop boat is usually given to a Frenchman named Thomas Piot. In 1891, Piot filed a patent application in the UK for a simple pop pop boat using a small boiler and two exhaust tubes. A 1975 article by Basil Harley mentions a similar boat seen in a French journal from 1880, indicating that this type of toy may have existed for many years prior to Piot's patent.

In 1915, an American named Charles J. McHugh filed a patent application for the diaphragm type of engine, which was an improvement to Piot's design. In 1920, William Purcell filed a patent for the coiled tube type of engine. This type of engine has been common over the years in homemade pop pop boats, due to its simplicity of construction. The Cub Scout book (published by the Boy Scouts of America) contained a project called a "Jet Boat" for many years. This project used a coil type of engine based on Purcell's design which was placed in a wooden hull. Many commercial pop pop boats have also used this type of engine, due to its low cost.

McHugh filed for another patent in 1926. This was again a diaphragm engine design, refined so that it could be more easily fabricated commercially. In 1934, Paul Jones filed a patent for another diaphragm design which could be produced industrially from simple stamped parts.

Many pop pop boats produced in the 1920s had a single exhaust pipe. Designs using two exhaust pipes are easier to fill, and have been much more common over the years.

Pop pop boats were popular for many years, especially in the 1940s and 1950s. Pop pop boats declined in popularity along with other tin toys in the latter half of the 20th century as plastic toys took over much of the market. While they are no longer produced in such large numbers, pop pop boats continue to be produced. These toys have come in many varieties over the years. Some have been simple and inexpensive, while others have been much more ornate and artistic. As with many toys, pop pop boats are often sought by collectors, and the prices paid vary depending on rarity and design.

== Design and construction ==
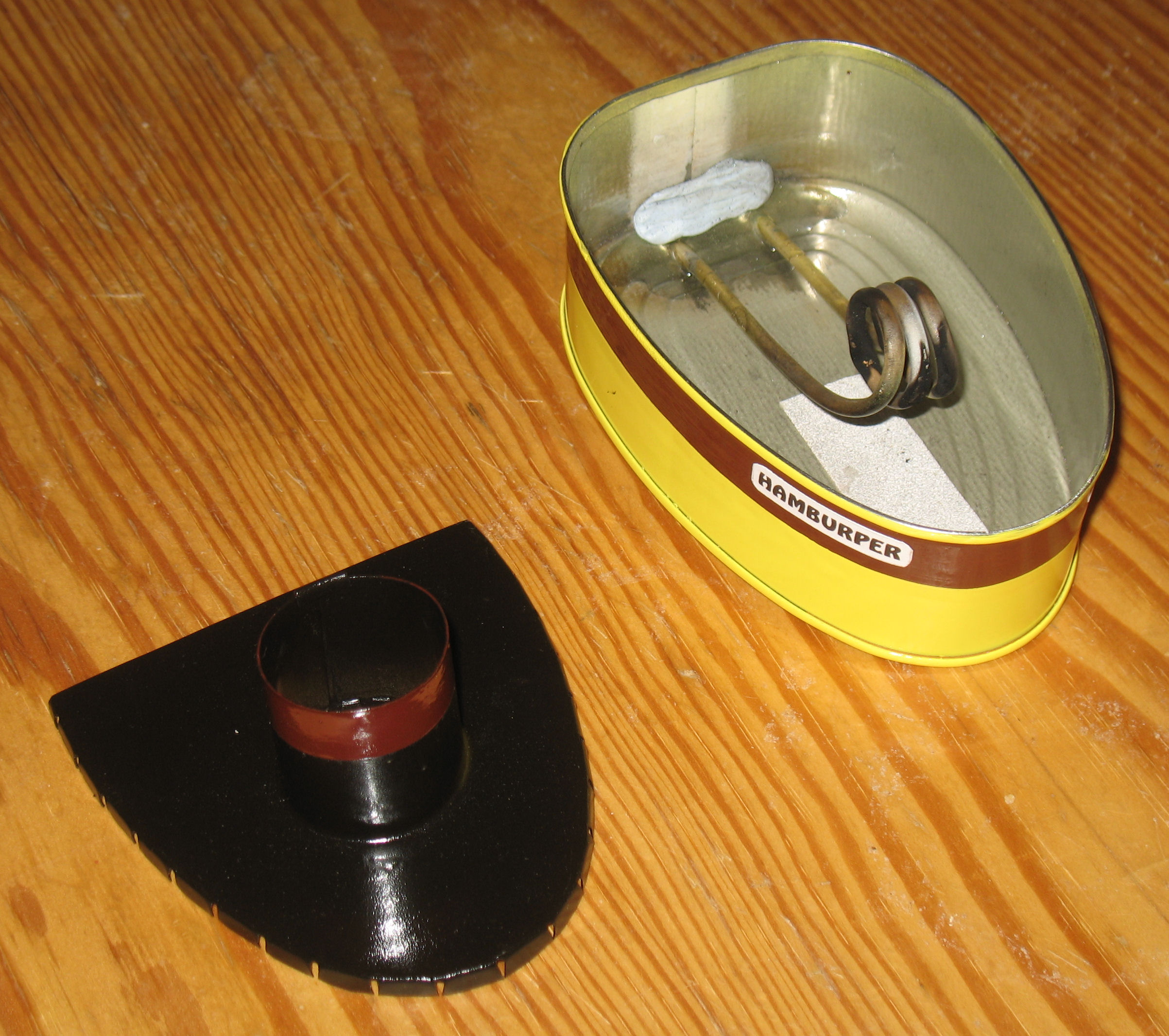
A home-made pop pop boat using a coil type boiler

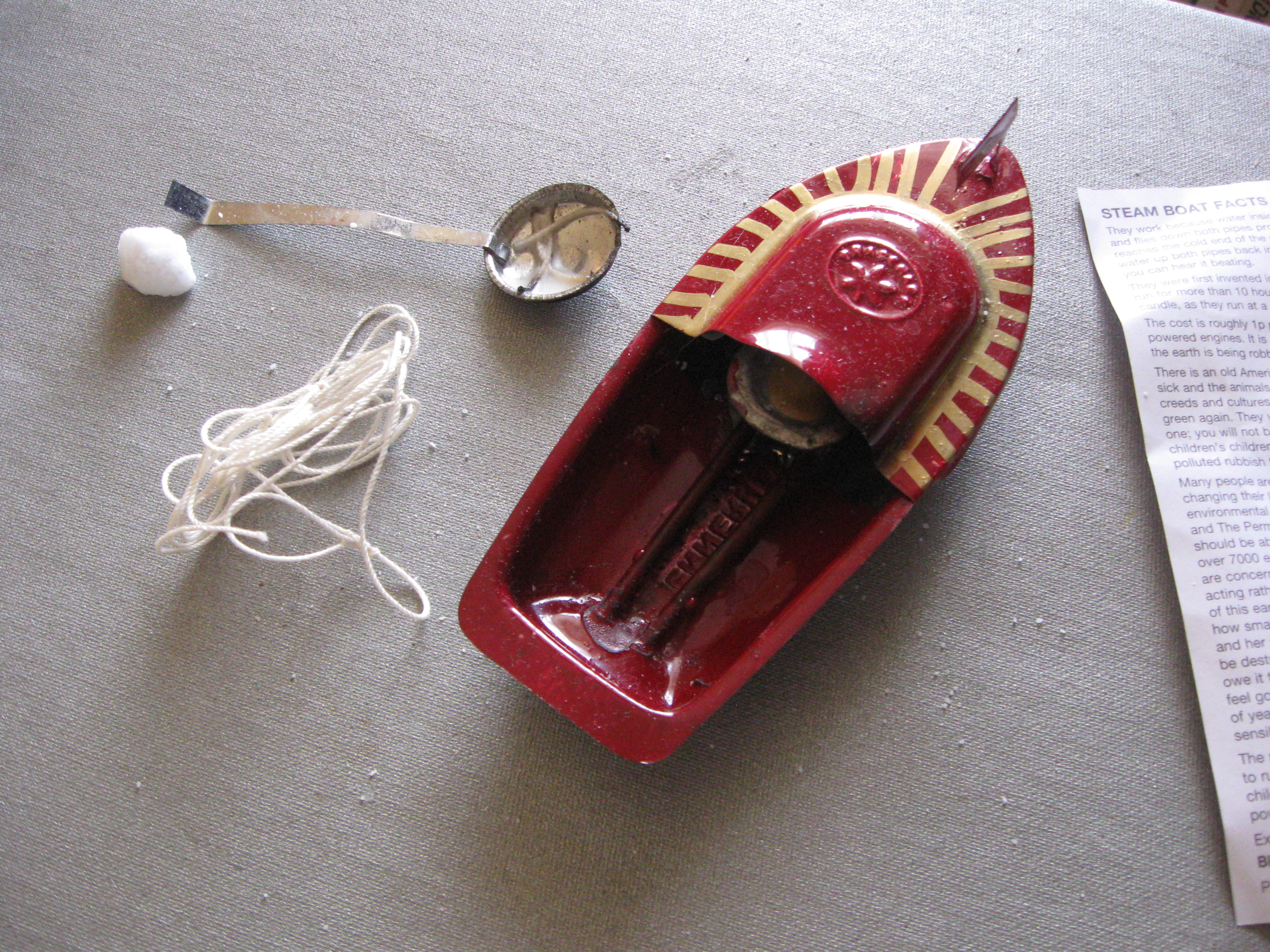
Pop pop boat with accessories. (Melted candle in the pan with a lit piece of wick provides the heat source.)

A pop pop boat is powered by a simple heat engine. This engine, sometimes referred to as a pulsating water engine, consists of a boiler and one or more exhaust tubes. A heating element of some sort is placed under the boiler. Candles or small oil burners are commonly used. While a single exhaust tube may be used, two exhaust tubes are much more commonly used. This is because the boiler and the exhaust tubes have to be filled with water, and using two tubes allows water to be injected into one tube while air inside the engine escapes through the other tube. The boiler and exhaust tubes are usually made out of metal, with tin or copper being common.

Commercial pop pop boats have usually been made out of tinplate. The hull of the boat may be made out of any material that floats. Homemade pop pop boats are often made out of wood.

Boiler designs vary. Simple metal containers in the shape of a box or cylinder are common. A more efficient boiler can be made by using a metal pan whose top is a slightly concave diaphragm made out of a thin, springy metal. Many pop pop boats have used a single tube of metal, which is formed into a coil in its center and left straight on both ends to form the exhausts. The coil in this version functions as the boiler.

== Principle of operation ==
When heat is applied to the boiler, water in the boiler evaporates, producing steam, pushing some of the water out of the exhaust tube, propelling the boat forward. The momentum of the column of water in the exhaust tube keeps it moving outward, reducing the pressure and temperature in the boiler, which in turn forces water back in. Then the cycle repeats, setting up an oscillation of water moving back and forth inside the tubes. When a diaphragm-type boiler is used, it makes a popping sound as the changes in pressure deform the diaphragm between concave and convex. Coil-type boilers are much quieter.

In pop pop boats with two exhaust tubes, the water is expelled from both tubes during the first phase of the cycle, and drawn in from both tubes during the second phase of the cycle. The water does not circulate in through one tube and out through the other. The internal-combustion analog of the pop pop boat engine is the valveless pulse jet.

Water contains some dissolved air, which can build up in the engine during operation. Therefore, engines must "burp" out air periodically in order to run for a long time.

The forward motion of the boat may seem surprising, because one might expect that water is going in and out through the exhaust tube would cause the boat to shake back and forth. The water pushed out carries away with it momentum, which must be balanced (by Newton's third law) by an opposite momentum that moves the boat forward. Then, water sucked in has an initial reaction force on the boat (which would pull it backward), which is cancelled by the water imparting its momentum to the boat as the water slows and stops before reversing direction. The result is that the inflow of water causes no appreciable force on the boat.

Some authors have argued that the reason why the pop pop boat works is that the water being propelled out the back of the boat forms a narrow jet, while the water being drawn back in on the second half of the cycle is drawn in from all directions. This asymmetry may be seen as well in the way in which one blows out a candle: it is easy to extinguish a candle by blowing on it, since all of the air expelled is moving in a concentrated, directional jet. However, it is difficult to put out the flame by sucking in air, the air being sucked in coming from all directions. This observation, though correct, may be misleading as an explanation of why the pop pop boat moves forward. The asymmetry of the shapes of the inflow and the outflow is a consequence of the viscosity of water, whereas the boat would still operate in an ideal fluid. Furthermore, as they pass through the exhausts, the inflowing and the outflowing water carry the same momentum (in opposite directions), relative to the boat. The important difference is that the momentum of the outflow is expelled, whereas the momentum of the inflow is soon transferred to the boat. The sucking/blowing asymmetry does make the boat more efficient, even if it's not the principle on which it operates.

The physics of the operation of the pop pop boat is similar to that of the Feynman sprinkler, a submerged sprinkler which is seen to turn weakly or not at all as water is sucked in through it. In both cases, the reaction force on the solid device caused by the sucking in of the fluid is balanced by the fluid impinging on the inside of the device.

== Flow visualization ==
The flow velocities at the exhaust of a pop pop boat can be measured using e.g. Particle Image Velocimetry. This quantitative visualization technique clearly shows rapid jets (vortex rings) that are expelled from the exhausts. It can also be seen how the fluid is sucked back into the exhaust. The peak flow velocities of this specific pop pop boat reach 0.4 m/s and the jet frequency is approximately 7 Hz.

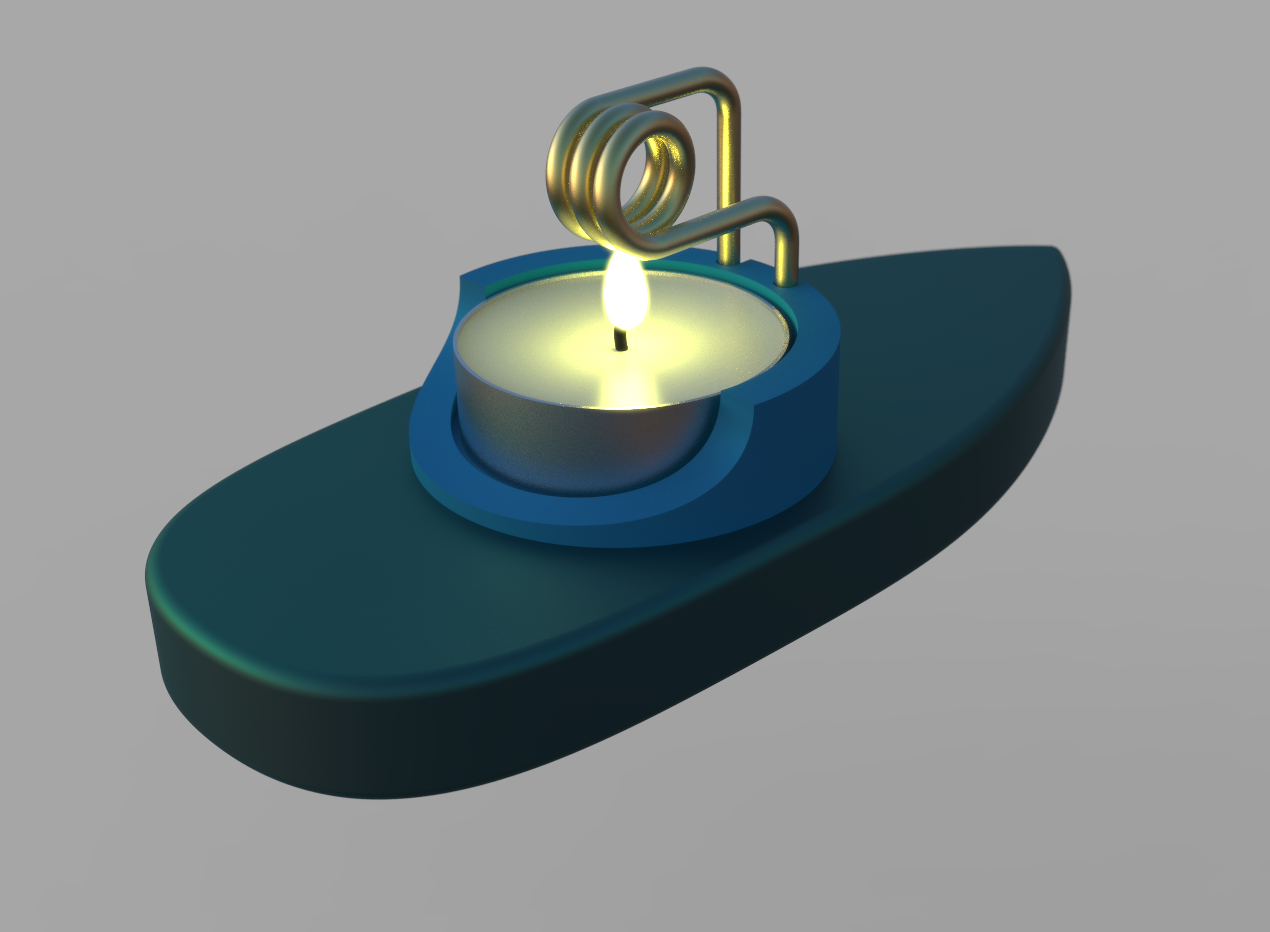
Top view of a pop pop boat

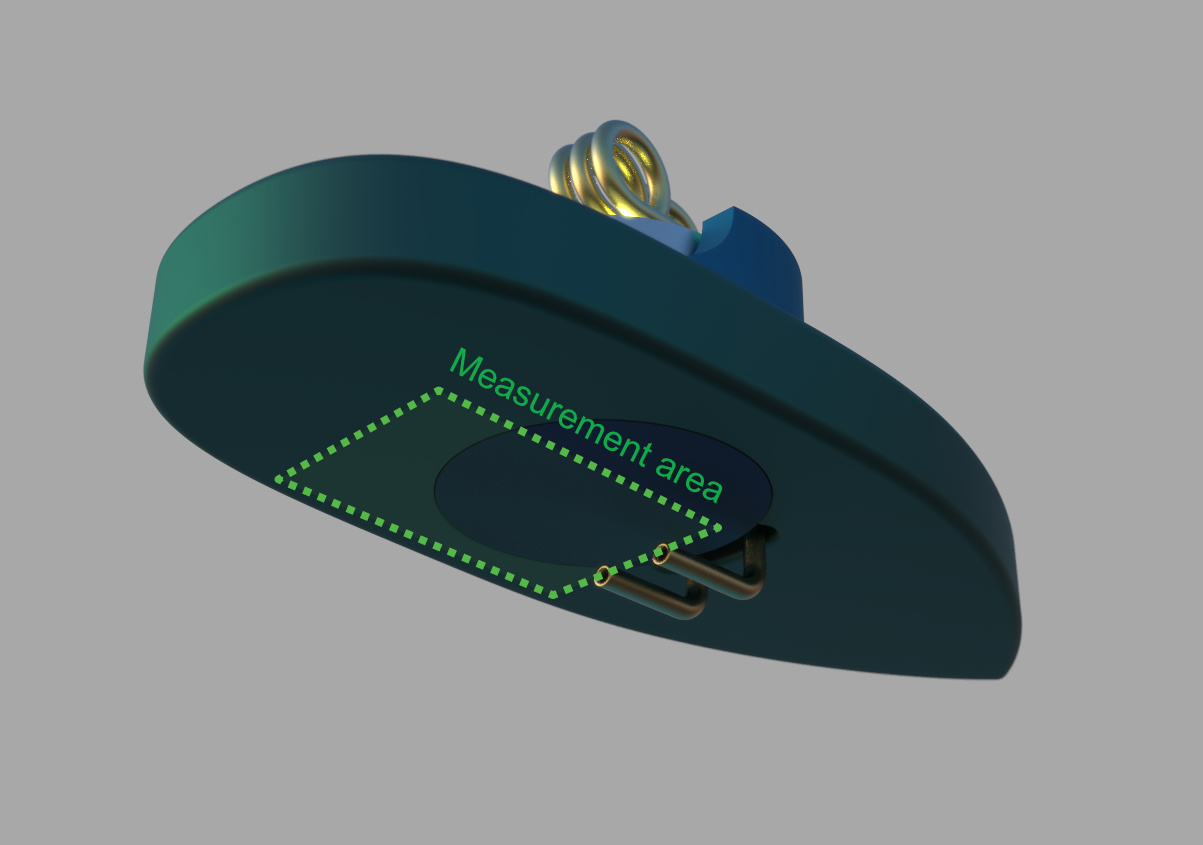
Measurement area for Particle image velocimetry of the fluid dynamics of a pop pop boat exhaust.

A Particle Image Velocimetry measurement of the fluid velocities at the exhausts of a pop pop boat.

A graph showing the flow velocities at a pop pop boat exhaust.

== Cultural impact ==
The pop pop boat featured prominently in the 2008 Japanese animated fantasy film Ponyo. Toy boats with a diaphragm type engine, like the one shown in the film, were produced and sold as a tie-in when the movie was released.

== See also ==
- Pulse jet engine – Engine where combustion is pulsed instead of continuous
