= Indutech =

Speciality industrial textiles

Indutech (Industrial textiles) is the branch of technical textile that deals with textiles used in various industrial applications such as in filtration, conveying, cleaning and other industrial uses.

== Industrial Textiles ==
These are the specially designed (unique and unconventional) textiles useful in the industrial processes, products and services. Technical textiles are classified with their area of applications, and they are divided into twelve distinctly separate categories, though certain sectors overlap each other. Industrial textiles can also act as a component to strengthen other products, or act as a tool similar to filtration, or it can be a product (independently) sufficing several functions. Indutech has vast application areas like filtration, cleaning, chemical industry, electrical applications and in mechanical engineering. Indutech includes conveyor belts, drive belts, ropes and cordages, filtration products, glass battery separators, decatising and bolting cloth, AGM (absorption glass mat) plasma screens, coated abrasives, composite materials, printed circuit boards, printer ribbon, seals, gaskets, paper making fabrics.

== Ratio ==
Indutech is a large economic activity. As per records referring reports of 2009-2010, in India, composite materials 37% and ropes and cordages around 27% were the major contributors in the total share of Indutech.

== Material ==
Several synthetic and high-performance fibers are used to achieve the appropriate performance from the components.

== See also ==
- Automotive textile: textiles used in a variety of applications in the automotive industry.
- Clothtech: technical textiles for clothing and footwear applications.
- Membrane technology
- Microfiltration: It is a type of membrane filtration process that uses semipermeable membranes to separate particles or molecules from a mixture. This process is widely used in various industries, including water treatment, food and beverage processing, and pharmaceutical manufacturing ¹.
- Performance (textiles): the ability of textiles to withstand various conditions and environments.
- Semipermeable membrane
- Oekotech: Technical textiles that are environmentally friendly.
