= Textile =

Various fibre-based materials

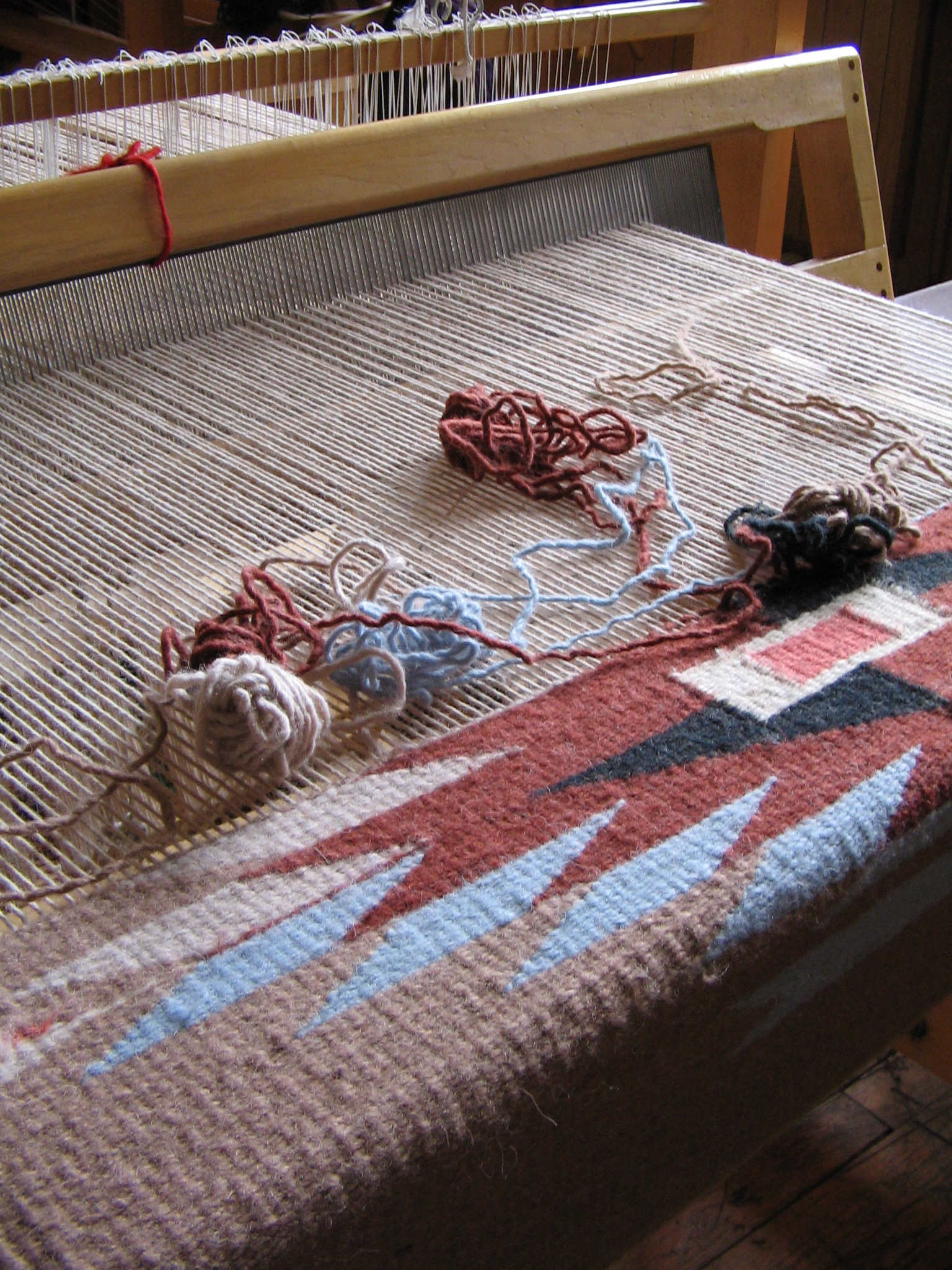
Longitudinal yarns (warp) are interlaced with weft or filing yarns to create a woven fabric

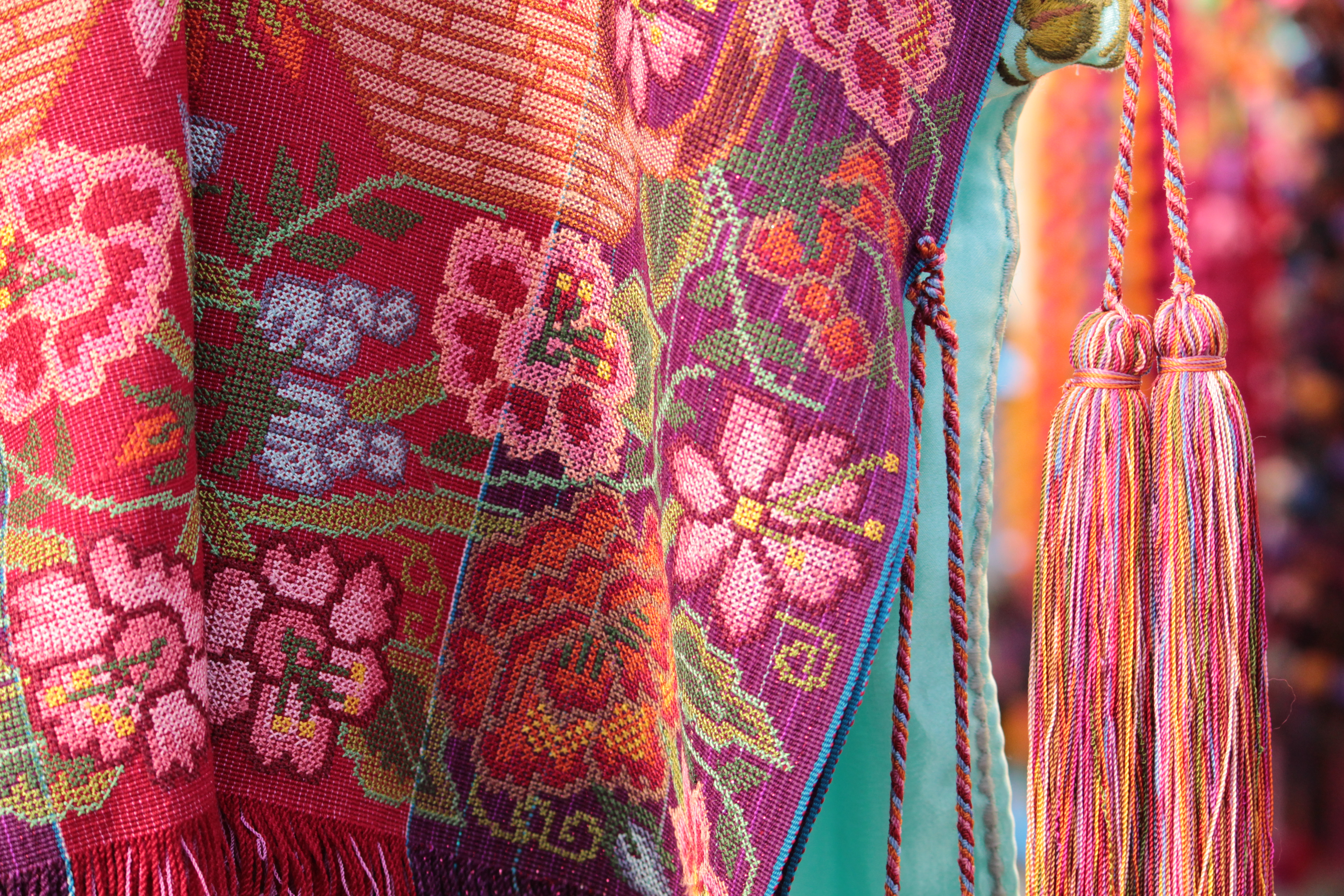
Handmade floral patterns on textiles

Weaving demonstration on an 1830 handloom in the weaving museum in Leiden

A textile is any of various fibre-based materials, including fibres, yarns, filaments, threads, and different types of fabric. Originally, textiles were woven; however, weaving is not the only manufacturing method, and many other methods were later developed to form textile structures based on their intended use. Knitting and non-woven are other popular types of fabric manufacturing. In the contemporary world, textiles satisfy the material needs for versatile applications, from simple daily clothing to bulletproof jackets, spacesuits, doctor's gowns and technical applications like geotextiles.

Textiles are divided into two groups: consumer textiles for domestic purposes and technical textiles. In consumer textiles, aesthetics and comfort are the most important factors, while in technical textiles, functional properties are the priority. The durability of textiles is an important property, with common cotton or blend garments (such as t-shirts) able to last twenty years or more with regular use and care.

Geotextiles, industrial textiles, medical textiles, and many other areas are examples of technical textiles, whereas clothing and furnishings are examples of consumer textiles. Each component of a textile product, including fibre, yarn, fabric, processing, and finishing, affects the final product. Components may vary among various textile products as they are selected based on their fitness for purpose.

Fibre is the smallest fabric component; fibres are typically spun into yarn, and yarns are used to manufacture fabrics. Fibre has a hair-like appearance and a higher length-to-width ratio. The sources of fibres may be natural, synthetic, or both. The techniques of felting and bonding directly transform fibres into fabric. In other cases, yarns are manipulated with different fabric manufacturing systems to produce various fabric constructions. The fibres are twisted or laid out to make a long, continuous strand of yarn. Yarns are then used to make different kinds of fabric by weaving, knitting, crocheting, knotting, tatting, or braiding. After manufacturing, textile materials are processed and finished to add value, such as aesthetics, physical characteristics, and utility in certain use cases. The manufacturing of textiles is the oldest industrial art. Dyeing, printing, and embroidery are all different decorative arts applied to textile materials.

== Etymology ==
=== Textile ===
The word 'textile' comes from the Latin adjective textilis, meaning 'woven', which itself stems from textus, the past participle of the verb texere, 'to weave'. Originally applied to woven fabrics, the term "textiles" is now used to encompass a diverse range of materials, including fibres, yarns, and fabrics, as well as other related items.

=== Fabric ===
A "fabric" is defined as any thin, flexible material made from yarn, directly from fibres, polymeric film, foam, or any combination of these techniques. Fabric has a broader application than cloth. Fabric is synonymous with cloth, material, goods, or piece goods. The word "fabric" also derives from Latin, with roots in the Proto-Indo-European language. Stemming most recently from the Middle French fabrique 'building', and earlier from the Latin fabrica 'workshop; an art, trade; a skillful production, structure, fabric', the noun fabrica stems from the Latin faber 'artisan who works in hard materials', which itself is derived from the Proto-Indo-European dhabh-, meaning "to fit together".

=== Cloth ===
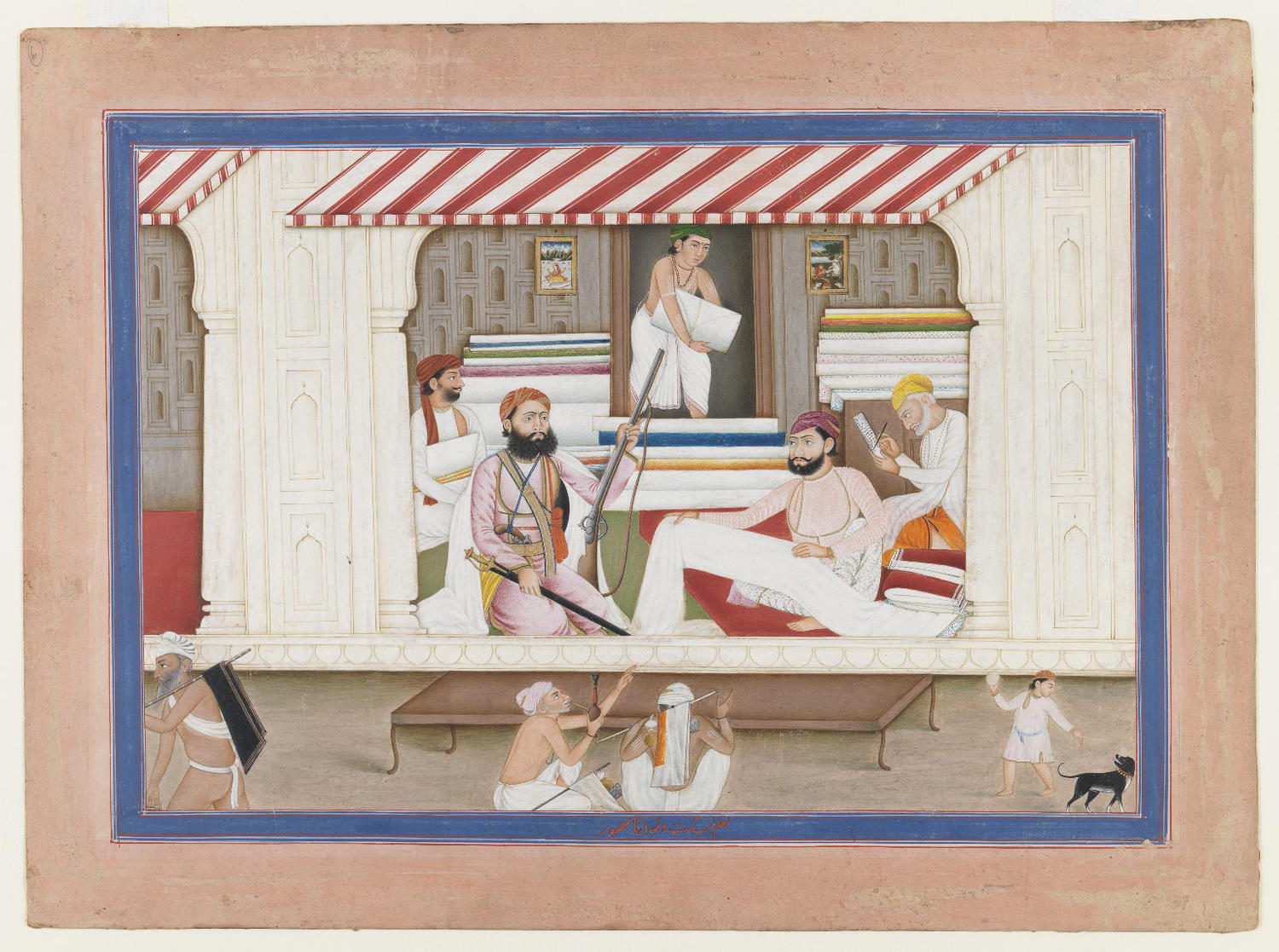
Cloth merchant's shop

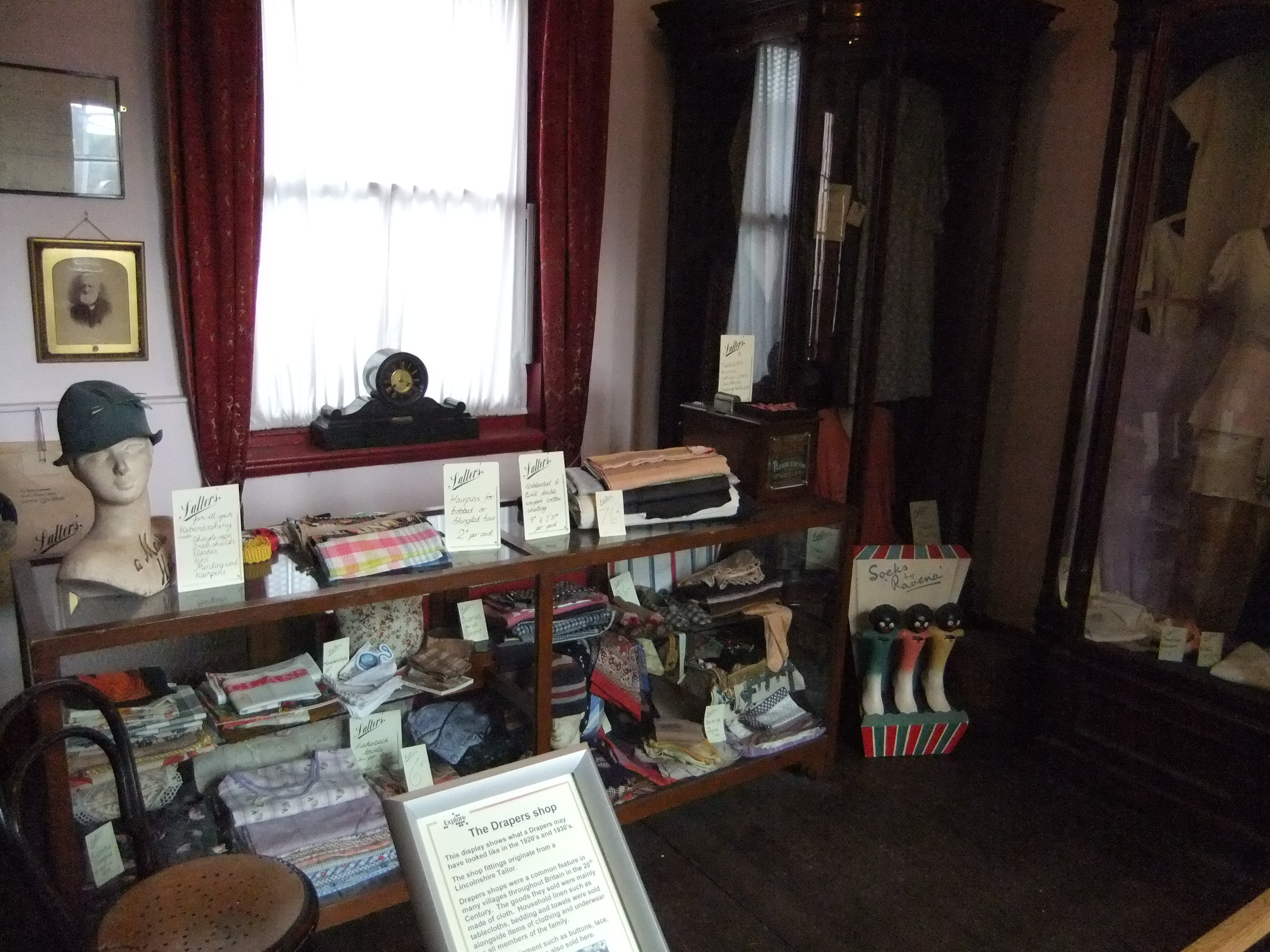
A replica draper's shop at the Museum of Lincolnshire Life, in Lincoln, England.

Materials that are woven, knitted, tufted, or knotted from yarns are referred to as cloth, while wallpaper, plastic upholstery products, carpets, and nonwoven materials are examples of fabrics.

Cloth is a flexible substance typically created through the processes of weaving, felting, or knitting using natural or synthetic materials. The word 'cloth' derives from the Old English clað, meaning "a cloth, woven, or felted material to wrap around one's body', from the Proto-Germanic klaithaz, similar to the Old Frisian klath, the Middle Dutch cleet, the Middle High German kleit and the German kleid, all meaning 'garment'.

== History ==
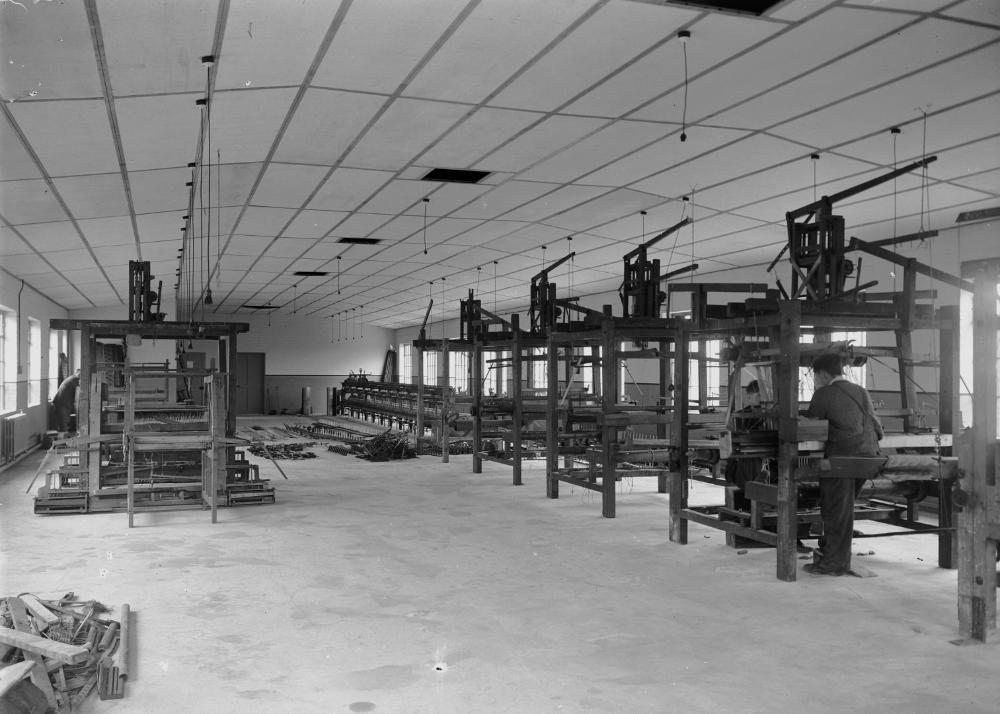
Textile machinery at the Cambrian Factory, Llanwrtyd, Wales in the 1940s.

Textiles themselves are too fragile to survive across millennia; the tools used for spinning and weaving make up most of the prehistoric evidence for textile work. The earliest tool for spinning was the spindle, to which a whorl was eventually added. The weight of the whorl improved the thickness and twist of the spun thread. Later, the spinning wheel was invented. Historians are unsure where; some say China, others India.

The precursors of today's textiles include leaves, bark, fur pelts, and felted cloths.

The Banton Burial Cloth, the oldest existing example of warp ikat in Southeast Asia, is displayed at the National Museum of the Philippines. The cloth was most likely made by the native Asian people of northwest Romblon. The first clothes, worn at least 70,000 years ago and perhaps much earlier, were probably made of animal skins and helped protect early humans from the elements. At some point, people learned to weave plant fibres into textiles.

The discovery of dyed flax fibres in a cave in the Republic of Georgia dated to 34,000 BCE suggests that textile-like materials were made as early as the Paleolithic era.

The speed and scale of textile production have been altered almost beyond recognition by industrialization and the introduction of modern manufacturing techniques. However, for the main types of textiles, plain weave, twill, or satin weave, there is little difference between the ancient and modern methods.

=== Textile industry ===
The textile industry grew out of art and craft and was kept going by craft guilds. In the 18th and 19th centuries, during the Industrial Revolution, it became increasingly mechanized. In 1765, when a machine for spinning wool or cotton called the spinning jenny was invented in the United Kingdom, textile production became the first economic activity to be industrialized. In the 20th century, science and technology were driving forces. The textile industry exhibits inherent dynamism, influenced by a multitude of transformative changes and innovations within the domain. Textile operations can experience ramifications arising from shifts in international trade policies, evolving fashion trends, evolving customer preferences, variations in production costs and methodologies, adherence to safety and environmental regulations, as well as advancements in research and development.

The textile and garment industries exert a significant impact on the economic systems of numerous countries engaged in textile production.

=== Naming ===
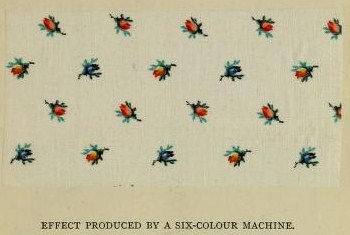
Sample of calico printed with a six-colour machine by Walter Crum & Co., from Frederick Crace Calvert, Dyeing and Calico Printing (1878)

Most textiles were called by their base-fibre generic names, their place of origin, or were put into groups based loosely on manufacturing techniques, characteristics, and designs.

Bearskin (bearskin cloth) may have received its name from its "shaggy nap".

"Nylon", "olefin", and "acrylic" are generic names for some of the more commonly used synthetic fibres.

Name	Product	Textiles named by		Description
Cashmere	Wool fibre obtained from cashmere goats	Origin	Kashmir	Cashmere is synonymous with the Kashmir shawl, with the term "cashmere" derived from an anglicization of Kashmir.
Calico	Plain weave textile material	Origin	Calicut	The fabric originated in the southwestern Indian city of Calicut.
Jaconet	Lightweight cotton fabric in plain weave	Origin	Jagannath Puri	Jaconet is an anglicization of Jagannath, where it was originally produced.
Jersey	A type of knitted fabric	Origin	Jersey, Channel Islands	Jersey fabric was produced first on Jersey in the Channel Islands.
Kersey	A coarse woollen cloth	Origin	Kersey, Suffolk	The fabric is named after the town in the east of England.
Paisley (design)	A type of motif	Design	Paisley, Renfrewshire	A town situated in the west central Lowlands of Scotland. The motif originates from Iran/Persia, later moving to India with Mughals and transported by British through silk route to Scotland.
Dosuti	A handspun cotton cloth	Characteristics	A coarse and thick cotton cloth	In and around the 19th century Punjab and Gujarat were famous for production of various handspun cloths. Dosuti was distinguished by the number of yarns (Do+Suti translates to 'two yarns') used to produce it. Eksuti was another variety using a single thread.
Mulmul types such as āb-i-ravān (running water), Baft Hawa (woven air)	Fine muslin fabric variations from Dacca in Bengal	Characteristics	Delicate muslin types	Dacca, in the eastern Indian subcontinent, produced a wide range of handwoven and spun muslins. Baft Hawa, which means "woven air", Shabnam, which means "evening dew", and ab-i-ravan, which means "flowing water" are some poetic names for soft muslins.
Nainsook	A plain weave fabric with soft hand	Characteristics	Pleasing to the eyes	Nain + Sook translates to "eye-pleasing".
Swanskin	A woven flannel cloth	Characteristics	Appears and feels like swan skin	An 18th-century fabric developed at Shaftesbury.
Tansukh	Another type of Muslin with soft and delicate texture	Characteristics	Pleasing to the body	Tan + Sukh translates to "body pleasing". Tansukh was a fine, soft, and delicate textured cloth. The cloth type is mentioned in the 16th-century Mughal-time records, Ain-i-Akbari.

=== Related terms ===
The related words "fabric" and "cloth" and "material" are often used in textile assembly trades (such as tailoring and dressmaking) as synonyms for textile. However, there are subtle differences in these terms in specialized usage. Material is an extremely broad term basically meaning consisting of matter, and requires context to be useful. A fabric is a material made through weaving, knitting, spreading, felting, stitching, crocheting or bonding that may be used in the production of further products, such as clothing and upholstery, thus requiring a further step of the production. Cloth may also be used synonymously with fabric, but often specifically refers to a piece of fabric that has been processed or cut.

- Greige goods: Textiles that are raw and unfinished are referred to as greige goods. After manufacturing, the materials are processed and finished.
- Piece goods: Piece goods were textile materials sold in cut pieces as specified by the buyer. Piece goods were either cut from a fabric roll or made to a specific length, also known as yard goods.

== Types ==
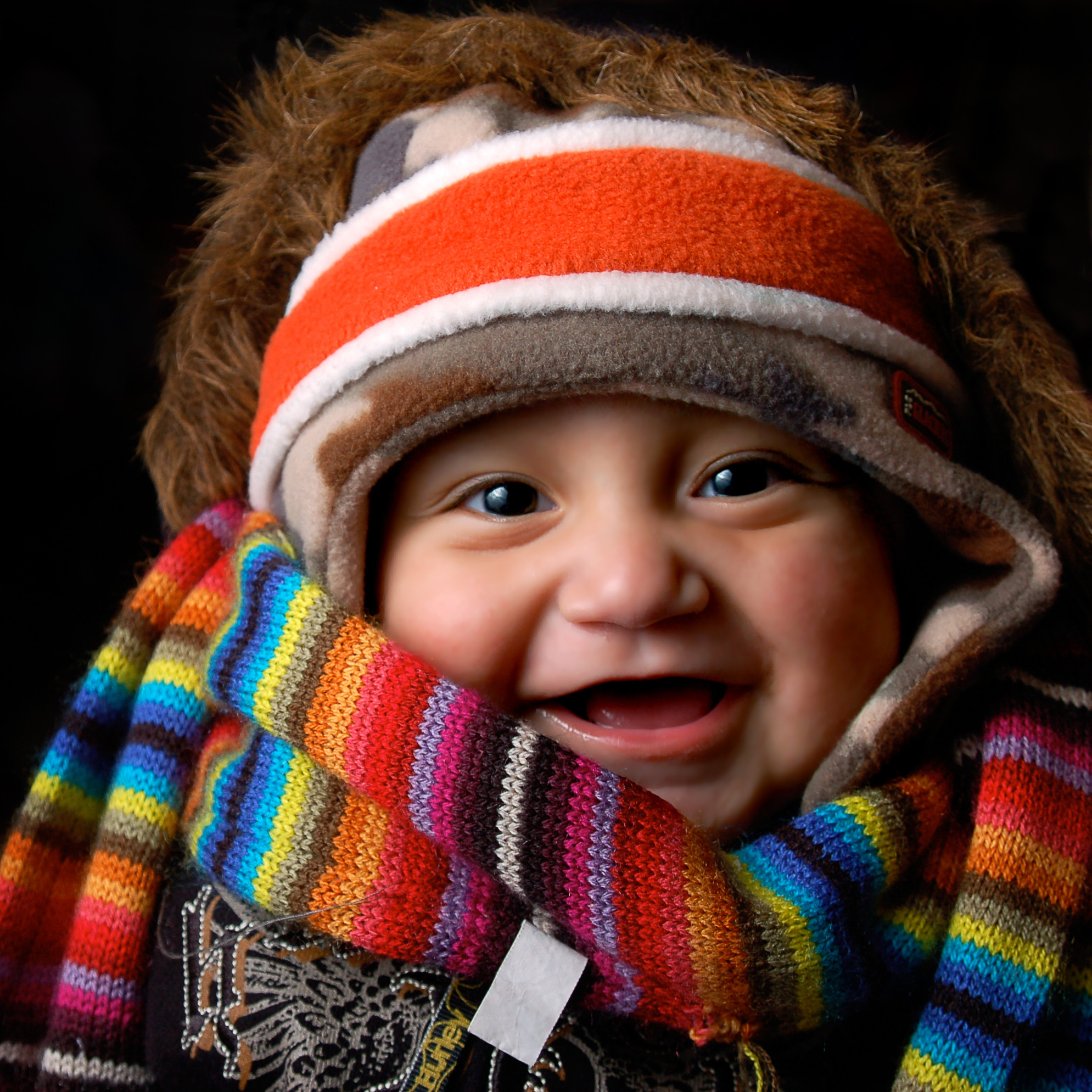
A baby wearing many items of soft winter clothing: headband, cap, fur-lined coat, scarf, and sweater

Textiles are various materials made from fibres and yarns. The term "textile" was originally only used to refer to woven fabrics, but today it covers a broad range of subjects. Textiles are classified at various levels, such as according to fibre origin (natural or synthetic), structure (woven, knitted, nonwoven), finish, etc. However, there are primarily two types of textiles:

=== Consumer textiles ===
Textiles have an assortment of uses, the most common of which are for clothing and for containers such as bags and baskets. In the household, textiles are used in carpeting, upholstered furnishings, window shades, towels, coverings for tables, beds, and other flat surfaces, and in art. Textiles are used in many traditional hand crafts such as sewing, quilting, and embroidery.

=== Technical textiles ===
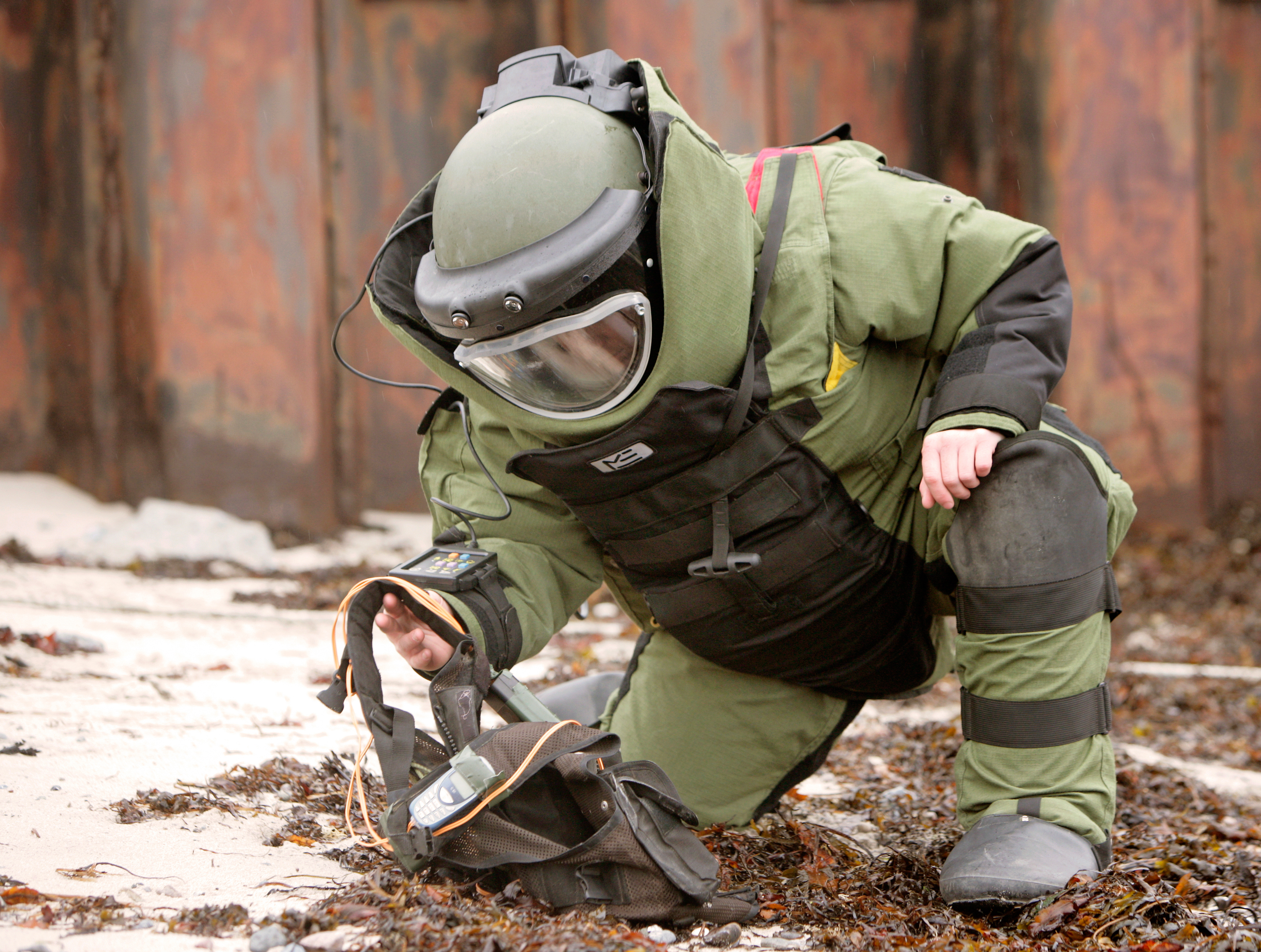
Technical textile is a branch of textile that focuses on the protection, safety and other functional performance attributes of textiles, unlike domestic textiles, where the primary focus is aesthetics and comfort. A technician wearing an explosive ordnance disposal (EOD) suit.

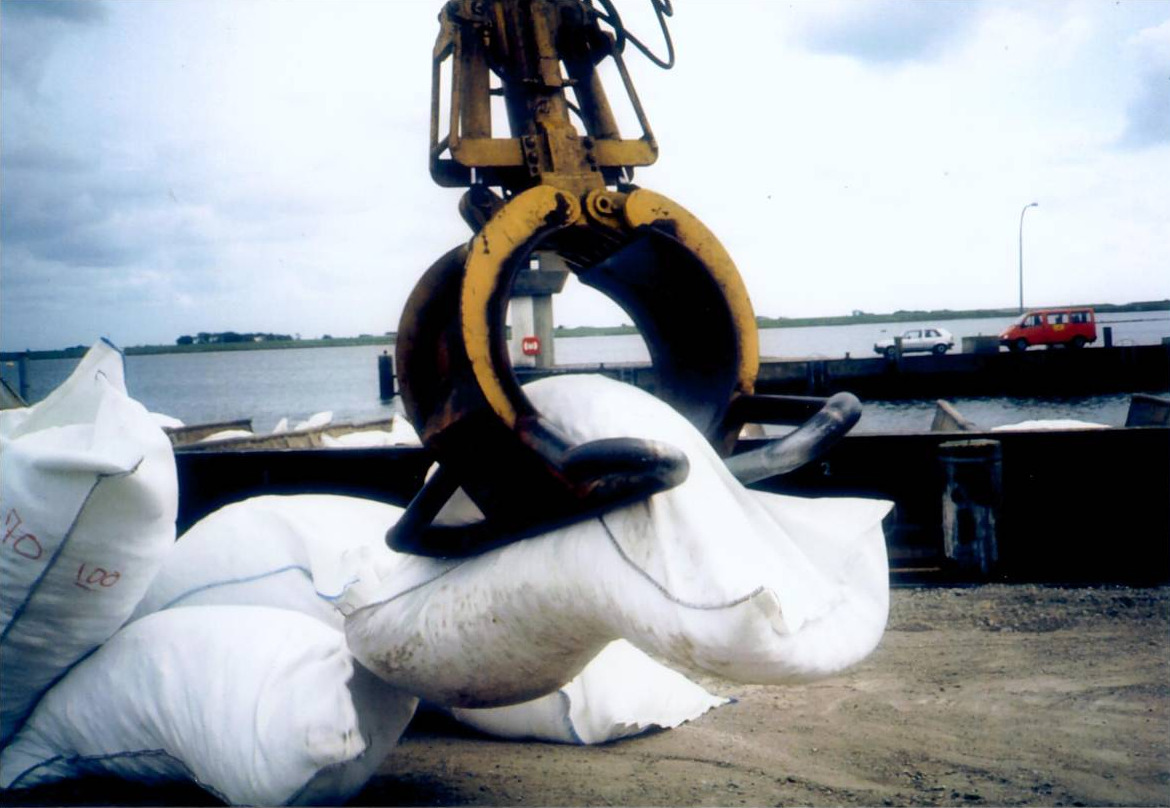
Nonwoven geotextile bags are much more robust than woven bags of the same thickness.

Textiles produced for industrial purposes, and designed and chosen for technical characteristics beyond their appearance, are commonly referred to as technical textiles. Technical textiles include textile structures for automotive applications, medical textiles (such as implants), geotextile (used for reinforcement of embankments), agrotextiles (textiles for crop protection), and protective clothing (such as clothing resistant to heat, radiation, or molten metals, and clothing resistant to puncture (for example, stab-resistant or bulletproof clothing)).

In the workplace, textiles can be used in industrial and scientific processes such as filtering. Miscellaneous uses include flags, backpacks, tents, nets, cleaning rags, and transportation devices such as balloons, kites, sails, and parachutes; textiles are also used to provide strengthening in composite materials such as fibreglass and industrial geotextiles.

Due to the often highly technical and legal requirements of these products, these textiles are typically tested to ensure they meet stringent performance requirements. Other forms of technical textiles may be produced to experiment with their scientific qualities and to explore the possible benefits they may have in the future. For example, threads coated with zinc oxide nanowires, when woven into fabric, have been shown capable of "self-powering nanosystems", using vibrations created by everyday actions like wind or body movements to generate energy.

=== Smart textiles ===
Smart textiles are fabrics incorporating sensing, communication, or responsive functions, such as wearable health monitoring garments, temperature-regulating fabrics, conductive textiles, and textile-based sensors.This could potentially be applied in fields such as healthcare, sports monitoring, military equipment, and fashion technology. However, the unique composition and embedded electronic elements of these e-textiles present significant challenges in end-of-life management, particularly in recycling and sustainable design.

== Significance ==
Textiles are component of basic needs like food and shelter. Textiles meet clothing needs, keeping people warm in the winter and cool in the summer. There are several applications for textiles, such as medical textiles, intelligent textiles, and automotive textiles.

=== Serviceability in textiles ===
The term "serviceability" refers to a textile product's ability to meet the needs of consumers. The emphasis is on knowing the target market and matching the needs of the target market to the product's serviceability. Serviceability or performance in textiles is the ability of textile materials to withstand various conditions, environments, and hazards. Aesthetics, durability, comfort and safety, appearance retention, care, environmental impact, and cost are the serviceability concepts employed in structuring the material.

=== Components ===
Fibres, yarns, fabric construction, finishes and design are components of a textile product. The selection of specific components varies with the intended use, therefore the fibres, yarns, and fabric manufacturing systems are selected with consideration of the required performance.

== Use and applications ==
Commercial textiles/ Domestic textiles	End uses	Technical textiles/ Industrial purpose textiles	End uses
Clothing	Clothing items for men, women and children. nightwear, sportswear, lingerie, undergarments, swimsuit. Accessories such as caps, umbrella, socks, gloves, and handbags.	Agro-textiles	Agro-textiles are used in agriculture, horticulture, aquaculture, landscape gardening and forestry. Mainly for crop protection, in crop development for instance shade nets, thermal insulation and sunscreen materials, windshield, antibird nets, covering livestock protection, suppressing weed and insect control, etc.
Furnishing	Upholstery, curtains, draperies, carpets, towels.	Geotextile	Technical textiles which are used in civil engineering, roads, airfields, railroads, embankments, retaining structures, reservoirs, canals, dams, bank protection, coastal engineering and construction site silt fences, and protection of melting glaciers.
Bedding	Bed sheets, khes, blankets, pillows.	Automotive textile	Airbags, seat belts, headliners, upholstery, car carpets, and door card.
Others	Shower curtains.	Medical textile	implants, sutures, dressings, bandages, medical gowns, face masks.
		Indutech	This particular sector includes conveyor belts, drive belts, ropes and cordages, filtration products, glass battery separators, decatising and bolting cloth, AGM (absorption glass mat) plasma screens, coated abrasives, composite materials, printed circuit boards, printer ribbon, seals, gaskets, paper making fabrics.

=== Other uses ===
Textiles, textile production, and clothing were necessities of life in prehistory, intertwined with the social, economic, and religious systems. Other than clothing, textile crafts produced utilitarian, symbolic, and opulent items. Archaeological artifacts from the Stone Age and the Iron Age in Central Europe are used to examine prehistoric clothing and its role in forming individual and group identities.

==== Source of knowledge ====
Artifacts unearthed in various archaeological excavations informs us about the remains of past human life and their activities. Dyed flax fibres discovered in the Republic of Georgia indicate that textile-like materials were developed during the Paleolithic period. Radiocarbon dates the microscopic fibres to 36,000 years ago, when modern humans migrated from Africa.

Several textile remnants, such as the Inca Empire's textile arts remnants, which embody the Incas' aesthetics and social ideals, serve as a means for disseminating information about numerous civilizations, customs, and cultures.

There are textile museums that display history related to many aspects of textiles. A textile museum raises public awareness and appreciation of the artistic merits and cultural significance of the world's textiles on a local, national, and international scale. The George Washington University Museum and Textile Museum in Washington, D.C., was established in 1925.

==== Narrative art ====
The Bayeux Tapestry is a rare example of secular Romanesque art. The art work depicts the Norman Conquest of England in 1066.

==== Decorative art ====
Textiles are also used for decorative art. Appliqué work of pipili is decorative art of Odisha, a state in eastern India, used for umbrellas, wall hangings, lamp shades, and bags. To make a range of decorative products, coloured cloth in the shapes of animals, birds, flowers, are sewn onto a base cloth.

==== Architextiles ====
Architextiles, a combination of the words architecture and textile, are textile-based assemblages. Awnings are a basic type of architectural textile. Mughal Shahi Lal Dera Tent, which was a movable palace, is an example of the architextiles of the Mughal period.

==== Currency ====
Textiles had been used as currency as well. In Africa, textiles were used as currency in addition to being used for clothing, headwear, swaddling, tents, sails, bags, sacks, carpets, rugs, curtains, etc. Along the east–west axis in sub-Saharan Africa, cloth strip, which was typically produced in the savannah, was used as a form of currency.

==== Votive offering ====
Textiles were among the objects offered to the gods [votive offering] in ancient Greece for religious purposes.

== Fibre ==
The smallest component of a fabric is fibre; fibres are typically spun into yarn, and yarns are used to make fabrics. Fibres are very thin and hair-like structures. The sources of fibres may be natural, synthetic, or both.

=== Global consumption ===
Global fibre production per person has increased from 8.4 kilograms in 1975 to 14.3 kilograms in 2021. After a modest drop due to COVID-19 pandemic in 2020, global fibre output rebounded to 113 million tons in 2021. Global fibre output roughly doubled from 58 million tons in 2000 to 113 million tons in 2021 and is anticipated to reach 149 million tons in 2030.

The demand for synthetic fibres is increasing rapidly. This has numerous causes. Reasons include its low price, the demand-supply imbalance of cotton, and its [Synthetic fibres'] versatility in design and application. Synthetic fibres accounts for 70% of global fibre use, mainly polyester. By 2030, the synthetic fibre market will reach 98.21 billion US dollars. From 2022 to 2030, the market is anticipated to increase by 5.1% per year.

=== Fibre sources ===
- Natural fibres are obtained from plants, animals and minerals. Since prehistoric times, textiles have been made from natural fibres. Natural fibres are further categorized as cellulosic, protein, and mineral.
- Synthetic or manmade fibres are manufactured with chemical synthesis.
- Semi-synthetic: A subset of synthetic or manmade fibres is semi-synthetic fibre. Rayon is a classified as a semi-synthetic fibre, made with natural polymers.

Monomers are the building blocks of polymers. Polymers in fibres are of two types: additive or condensation. Natural fibres, such as cotton and wool, have a condensation polymer type, whereas synthetic fibres can have either an additive or a condensation polymer type. For example, acrylic fibre and olefin fibres have additive polymers, and nylon and polyester are condensation polymers.

=== Types ===
Types of fibres
Natural			Synthetic	Semi-synthetic
Cellulosic fibres (Vegetable or plant fibres)	Protein fibres (Animal fibres)	Mineral fibres	Petroleum based	Cellulose based
Cotton	Wool	Asbestos	Nylon	Rayon
Linen	Silk	Glass fibre	Polyester	Acetate
Jute			Acrylic fibre	Triacetate
Hemp			Olefin fibre	
Bamboo Fibre			Spandex	
			Aramid	

=== Fibre properties ===
Fibre properties influence textile characteristics such as aesthetics, durability, comfort, and cost. Fineness is one of the important characteristics of the fibres. They have a greater length-to-width ratio [100 times the diameter]. Fibres need to be strong, cohesive, and flexible. The usefulness of fibres are characterized on the basis of certain parameters such as strength, flexibility, and length to diameter ratio, and spinnability. Natural fibres are relatively short [staple] in length. Synthetic fibres are produced in longer lengths called filaments. Silk is the only natural fibre that is a filament. The classification of fibres is based on their origin, derivation, and generic types.

Certain properties of synthetic fibres, such as their diameter, cross section, and colour, can be altered during production.

Cotton: Cotton has a long history of use in the clothing due to its favourable properties. This fibre is soft, moisture-absorbent, breathable, and is renowned for its long durability.

==== Blends (blended textiles) ====
Fabric or yarn produced with a mixture of two or more types of different fibres, or yarns to obtain desired traits. Blending is possible at various stages of textile manufacturing. Final composition is liable for the properties of the resultant product. Natural and synthetic fibres are blended to overcome disadvantage of single fibre properties and to achieve better performance characteristics and aesthetic effects such as devoré, heather effect, cross dyeing and stripes pattern etc. Clothing woven from a blend of cotton and polyester can be more durable and easier to maintain than material woven solely from cotton. Other than sharing functional properties, blending makes the products more economical.

Union or Union fabrics is the 19th century term for blended fabrics. While it is no longer in use. Mixture or mixed cloth is another term used for blended cloths when different types of yarns are used in warp and weft sides.

Blended textiles are not new.

- Mashru was a 16th-century fabric, is one of the earliest forms of "mixed cloth", a material composed of silk and cotton.
- Siamoise was a 17th-century cotton and linen material.

==== Composition ====
Fibre composition the fibre blend composition of mixtures of the fibres, is an important criterion to analyse the behaviour, properties such as functional aspects, and commercial classification of the merchandise.

The most common blend is cotton and polyester. Regular blended fabric is 65% polyester and 35% cotton. It is called a reverse blend if the ratio of cotton predominates—the percentage of the fibres changes with the price and required properties.

Blending adds value to the textiles; it helps in reducing the cost (artificial fibres are less expensive than natural fibres) and adding advantage in properties of the final product. For instance, a small amount of spandex adds stretch to the fabrics. Wool can add warmth.

== Uses of different fibres ==
=== Natural fibres ===
==== Plant ====
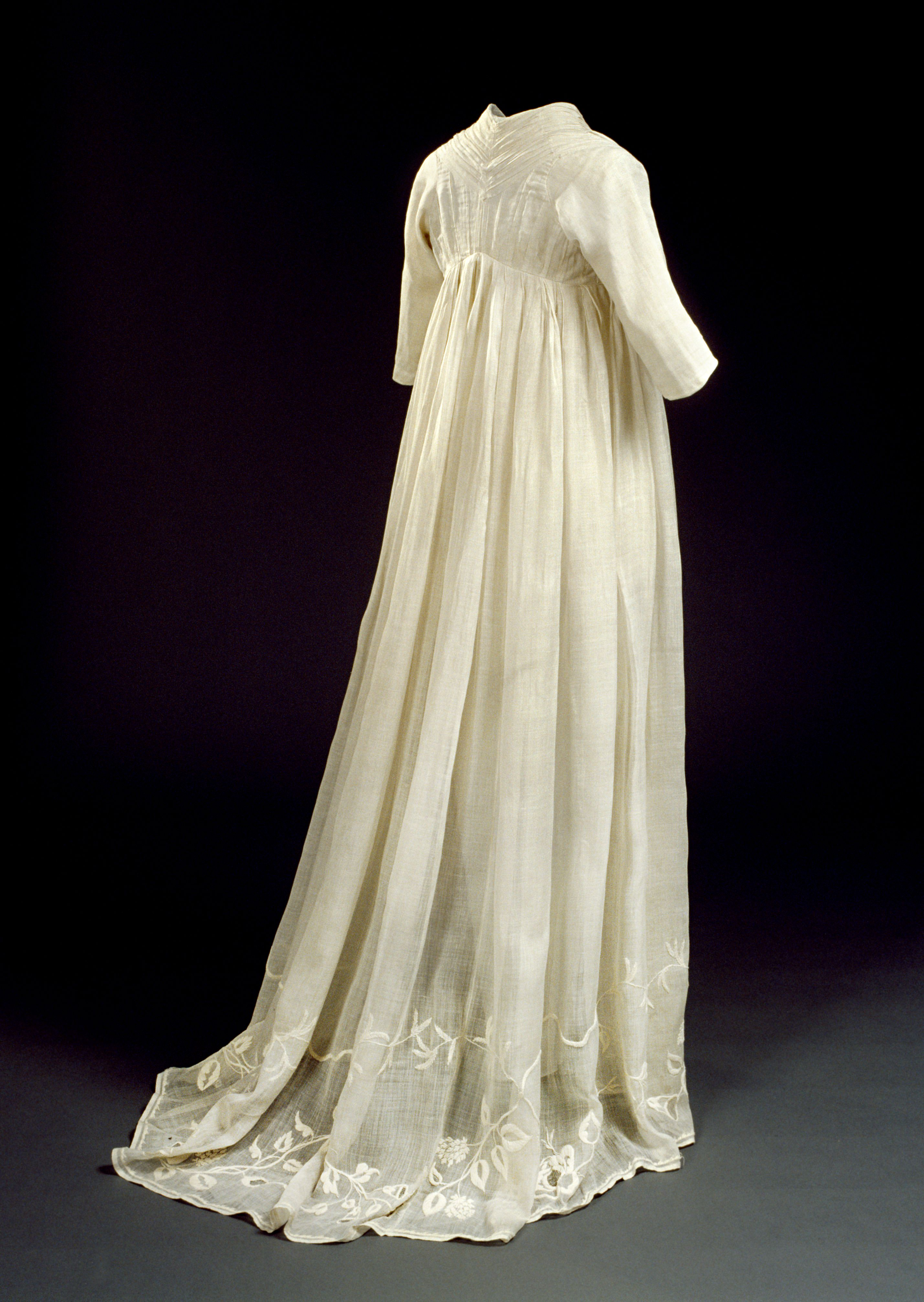
Bridal gown made from nettle fibres, probably worn by Eleonora Sophie Rantzau (1779-) at her wedding to Preben Bille-Brahe, Hvedholm Castle. National Museum of Denmark.

- Grass, rush, hemp, and sisal are all used in making rope. In the first two, the entire plant is used for this purpose, while in the last two, only fibres from the plant are used. Coir (coconut fibre) is used in making twine, and also in floormats, doormats, brushes, mattresses, floor tiles, and sacking.
- Straw and bamboo are both used to make hats. Straw, a dried form of grass, is also used for stuffing, as is kapok.
- Fibres from pulpwood trees, cotton, rice, hemp, and nettle are used in making paper.
- Cotton, flax, jute, hemp, modal, banana, bamboo, lotus, eucalyptus, mulberry, and sugarcane are all used in clothing. Piña (pineapple fibre) and ramie are also fibres used in clothing, generally with a blend of other fibres such as cotton. Nettles have also been used to make a fibre and fabric very similar to hemp or flax. The use of milkweed stalk fibre has also been reported, but it tends to be somewhat weaker than other fibres like hemp or flax.
- The inner bark of the lacebark tree is a fine netting that has been used to make clothing and accessories as well as utilitarian articles such as rope.
- Acetate is used to increase the shininess of certain fabrics such as silks, velvets, and taffetas.
- Seaweed is used in the production of textiles: a water-soluble fibre known as alginate is produced and is used as a holding fibre; when the cloth is finished, the alginate is dissolved, leaving an open area.
- Rayon is a manufactured fibre derived from plant pulp. Different types of rayon can imitate feel and texture of silk, cotton, wool, or linen.

Fibres from the stalks of plants, such as hemp, flax, and nettles, are also known as 'bast' fibres. Hemp fibre is yellowish-brown fibre made from the hemp plant. The fibre characteristics are coarser, harsher, strong and lightweight. Hemp fibre is used primary to make twine, rope and cordage.

==== Animal ====
Animal textiles are commonly made from hair, fur, skin, or silk (in the case of silkworms).

- Wool refers to the hair of the domestic sheep or goat, which is distinguished from other types of animal hair in that the individual strands are coated with scales and tightly crimped, and the wool as a whole is coated with a wax mixture known as lanolin (sometimes called wool grease), which is waterproof and dirtproof. The lanolin and other contaminants are removed from the raw wool before further processing. Woollen refers to a yarn produced from carded, non-parallel fibre, while worsted refers to a finer yarn spun from longer fibres which have been combed to be parallel.
  - Other animal textiles which are made from hair or fur are alpaca wool, vicuña wool, llama wool, chiengora, shatoosh, yak fibre and camel hair, generally used in the production of coats, jackets, ponchos, blankets, and other warm coverings.
  - Cashmere, the hair of the Indian cashmere goat, and mohair, the hair of the North African angora goat, are types of wool known for their softness. Pashmina is a type of very fine cashmere wool. Used in the production of sweaters and scarfs.
  - Angora refers to the long, thick, soft hair of the angora rabbit. Qiviut is the fine inner wool of the muskox.
- Silk is an animal textile made from the fibres of the cocoon of the Chinese silkworm which is spun into a smooth fabric prized for its softness. There are two main types of the silk: 'mulberry silk' produced by the Bombyx mori, and 'wild silk' such as Tussah silk (wild silk). Silkworm larvae produce the first type if cultivated in habitats with fresh mulberry leaves for consumption, while Tussah silk is produced by silkworms feeding purely on oak leaves. Around four-fifths of the world's silk production consists of cultivated silk. Silk products include pillow covers, dresses, tops, skirts, bed sheets, curtains.

==== Microbes ====
Bacterial cellulose can be made from industrial organic and agricultural waste, and used as material for textiles and clothing.

==== Mineral ====
- Asbestos and basalt fibre are used for vinyl tiles, sheeting and adhesives, "transite" panels and siding, acoustical ceilings, stage curtains, and fire blankets.
- Glass fibre is used in the production of ironing board and mattress covers, ropes and cables, reinforcement fibre for composite materials, insect netting, flame-retardant and protective fabric, soundproof, fireproof, and insulating fibres. Glass fibres are woven and coated with Teflon to produce beta cloth, a virtually fireproof fabric which replaced nylon in the outer layer of United States space suits since 1968.
- Metal fibre, metal foil, and metal wire have a variety of uses, including the production of cloth-of-gold and jewellery. Hardware cloth (US term only) is a coarse woven mesh of steel wire, used in construction. It is much like standard window screening, but heavier and with a more open weave.

Minerals and natural and synthetic fabrics may be combined, as in emery cloth, a layer of emery abrasive glued to a cloth backing. Also, "sand cloth" is a US term for fine wire mesh with abrasive glued to it, employed like emery cloth or coarse sandpaper.

=== Synthetic ===
In the 20th century, they were supplemented by artificial fibres made from petroleum. Textiles are made in various strengths and degrees of durability, from the finest microfibre made of strands thinner than one denier to the sturdiest canvas.

Synthetic textiles are used primarily in the production of clothing, as well as the manufacture of geotextiles. Synthetic fibres are those that are constructed by humans through chemical synthesis.

- Polyester fibre is used in all types of clothing, either alone or blended with fibres such as cotton.
- Aramid fibre (e.g. Twaron) is used for flame-retardant clothing, cut-protection, and armour.
- Acrylic is a fibre used to imitate wools, including cashmere, and is often used in replacement of them.
- Nylon is a fibre used to imitate silk; it is used in the production of pantyhose. Thicker nylon fibres are used in rope and outdoor clothing.
- Spandex (trade name Lycra) is a polyurethane product that can be made tight-fitting without impeding movement. It is used to make activewear, bras, and swimsuits.
- Olefin fibre is a fibre used in activewear, linings, and warm clothing. Olefins are hydrophobic, allowing them to dry quickly. A sintered felt of olefin fibres is sold under the trade name Tyvek.
- Ingeo is a polylactide fibre blended with other fibres such as cotton and used in clothing. It is more hydrophilic than most other synthetics, allowing it to wick away perspiration.
- Lurex is a metallic fibre used in clothing embellishment.
- Milk proteins have also been used to create synthetic fabric. Milk or casein fibre cloth was developed during World War I in Germany, and further developed in Italy and America during the 1930s. Milk fibre fabric is not very durable and wrinkles easily, but has a pH similar to human skin and possesses anti-bacterial properties. It is marketed as a biodegradable, renewable synthetic fibre.
- Carbon fibre is mostly used in composite materials, together with resin, such as carbon fibre reinforced plastic. The fibres are made from polymer fibres through carbonization.

== Production methods ==
Textile manufacturing has progressed from prehistoric crafts to a fully automated industry. Over the years, there have been continuous improvements in fabric structure and design.

Production methods
Production method	Description	Inventors, inventions and milestones in progression	
Barkcloth	Barkcloth is made by pounding bark until it is soft and flat.	Bark is an older known fabric; ancient people around the world wore bark cloth daily until woven fabrics replaced it. In Indonesia, the bark cloth is associated with the Torajan people, who made it from the fermentation of inner bark of certain local trees, mulberry and pandanus. The Torajans used stones and wooden beaters to produce bark cloth.	Barkcloth dress of Lore Bada people in Lore Valley, Poso Regency, Central Sulawesi, Indonesia. This collection of Central Sulawesi Museum was exhibited in Textile Museum Jakarta in November 2016.
Felt and other nonwoven fabrics	Felting is a method of manufacturing fabric directly from fibres by entangling, interlocking the fibres by mechanical action (like rubbing and pressing) and often aided by heat and moisture.	Felting is another old method of fabric manufacturing. While civilizations in the western Mediterranean improved their weaving skills, nomads in Central Asia learned how to make felt, a non-woven material, from wool. Felting involves applying pressure and friction to a mat of fibres, working and rubbing them together until the fibres become interlocked and tangled, forming a nonwoven textile. A liquid, such as soapy water, is usually added to lubricate the fibres, and to open up the microscopic scales on strands of wool. More recently, additional methods have been developed to bond fibres into nonwoven fabrics, including needle punching, adhesives, and chemical binding.	Kazakh felt yurt Spunbond nonwoven fabric
Weaving	Weaving is a textile production method which involves interlacing a set of longer threads (called the warp) with a set of crossing threads (called the weft). This is done on a frame or machine known as a loom, of which there are a number of types. Some weaving is still done by hand, but the vast majority is mechanized.	Handlooms: Early looms date to 5000 BC. From antiquity until the mediaeval times, the loom improved in both Asia and Europe, despite the fact that the loom's fundamental operation remained unchanged. In 200 BC, the Chinese invented vertical looms and pedal looms, transforming the craft into an industry. By decreasing the worker's workload, innovative solutions improved productivity. There were harnesses and heddles to govern the movement of the warp yarn, a shuttle to transport the weft yarns, a reed to compact the cloth, and a take up roller to roll down the cloth. By the 1st century AD, all necessary components for a loom were assembled. Power looms: John Kay invented the flying shuttle in 1734 in Bury, Lancashire. It was one of the first innovations in the cotton woven fabric industry. Samuel Crompton invented a spinning machine in 1779 that produced yarn faster than ever before. Then Edmund Cartwright invented the first power loom in 1785. Jacquard loom: The Jacquard machine was a modified version of programmable loom developed in 1804. It was developed by Joseph Marie Jacquard based on earlier inventions by Basile Bouchon (1725), Jean Baptiste Falcon (1728), and Jacques Vaucanson (1740). The industrial revolution in the 18th century led to mass production of yarn and cloth, which led to the growth of the woven fabric part of the textile industry.	Warp and weft
Knitting	Knitting involves interlacing loops of yarn, which are formed either on a knitting needle, needle, or on a crochet hook, together in a line. The processes are different in that knitting has several active loops at one time, on the knitting needle waiting to interlock with another loop.	Hand knitting: Though knitting was developed by Danes around 900 BC it did not reach to other civilizations until 900 AD. Europe learned to knit by hand around 1400. Three to four stockings could be knit in a week by 1450. William Lee invented a stocking frame in 1589 that could knit one stocking per day. Acceptance of Lee's invention and subsequent modifications resulted in a wide range of fabrics in Europe. The machine knitting is separated into two main groups of production processes: warp knitting and weft knitting.	Loop formation. Structure of stockinette stitch in a weft knitted fabric.
Nålebinding	Nålebinding involves the use of a needle to form loops of yarn, by passing the full length of yarn through each loop (unlike knitting and crocheting).	Nålebinding is a precursor of crocheting and knitting.	Mittens produced by nålebinding
Crocheting	Crocheting never involves more than one active stitch on the needle. Knitting can be performed by machine, but crochet can only be performed by hand.	Crocheting was originally practised by Scottish peasants with a small, hooked needle known as a shepherd's hook.	Most crochet uses one hook and works upon one stitch at a time. Crochet may be worked in circular rounds without any specialized tools, as shown here.
Spread tow	Spread tow is a production method where the tow fibres are spread into thin tapes, and then the tapes are woven as warp and weft. This method is mostly used for composite materials; spread tow fabrics can be made in carbon, aramid and other fibres.		
Braiding or plaiting	Braiding or plaiting involves intertwining threads together into cloth.		Braiding
Knotting	Knotting involves tying threads together and is used in making tatting and macrame.		
Lace	Lace is made by interlocking threads together to create a fine fabric with open holes in the work. Lace can be made by either hand (e.g. needle lace or bobbin lace) or machine.		Bobbin lace in progress
3D Textiles	Complex interlacement of yarns where the final product has not plain form as flat fabrics, but 3D form.	All technologies - weft knitting, warp knitting, weaving and braiding allow production of complex products with 3D form if suitable machine configuration and pattern are used. This technologies are used for woven heart valves, composite profiles and other.	
Additive manufactured textile like structures	Fabric manufacturing by 3D printer employs additive manufacturing, also known as additive layer manufacturing (ALM), a CAD-aided manufacturing technique that builds the object layer by layer. The method is used in manufacturing of Auxetic textiles and in composite materials.		3D-printed outfit

Important parameters in fabric selection:

The primary consideration in fabric selection is the end use. The fabric needs vary greatly depending on the application. Similar types of fabric may not be suitable for all applications.

Fabric weight is an important criteria while producing different fabrics. A carpet requires a fabric with 1300 GSM, but a robe may be made with 160 GSM. Certainly, fabrics for clothes and carpets have distinct weights.

Range of fabric weights typically used in various textile products
GSM (grams per square metre) range	Categorization	Termed as	Suitable for the textile products
0–50	Sheer fabric		Sheer curtains, Lingerie items, Wedding dresses,
50–150	Light weight	Top weight	Blouse, Lining, Shirt, T-shirt, Dress
150–300	Medium weight	Bottom weight	Skirts, trousers, denims, and suits
300–600	Medium to heavy weight	Bull denim	Drapery, overcoat, towel, slipcover, workwear
More than 600	Heavy		Carpet, mat, upholstery, winter coats

Stretchable fabrics have greater movability and are thus more comfortable than fabrics with no stretch or less stretch.

=== Textile exports ===
Top five exporters of textiles—2013 ($ billion)
China	274
India	40
Italy	36
Germany	35
Bangladesh	28

According to the UN Commodity Trade Statistics Database, the global textiles and apparel export market reached $772 billion in 2013.

==== Changing dynamics of the market ====
China is the largest exporter of textile goods. Most of China's exports consist of apparel, apparel accessories, textile yarns, and textile products. The competitive advantages of the China are low prices and abundant labor, lowered commercial obstacles, and a ready supply of raw materials. China, along with the United States and India, is a major producer of cotton.

China's apparel market share has declined in recent years due to various reasons and a shift toward high-end, sophisticated products. Additionally, the investors from China made stakes in Myanmar, Vietnam, and Cambodia. Last year, its market share was 36.7%, or $161 billion, a decline of 8% year-over-year. In other words, China lost $14 billion in garment work orders to other countries in a single year. In 2016, Bangladesh's apparel market share was valued at $28 billion, increasing 7.69 percent from the previous year.

In 2016 the leading exporters of apparel were China ($161 billion), Bangladesh ($28 billion), Vietnam ($25 billion), India ($18 billion), Hong Kong ($16 billion), Turkey ($15 billion), and Indonesia ($7 billion).

Garment exports from Bangladesh reached record high in the 2021–2022 fiscal year; China ($220,302 billion), Bangladesh ($38.70 billion), India ($8.127 billion), Pakistan ($19.33 billion).

== Finishing ==
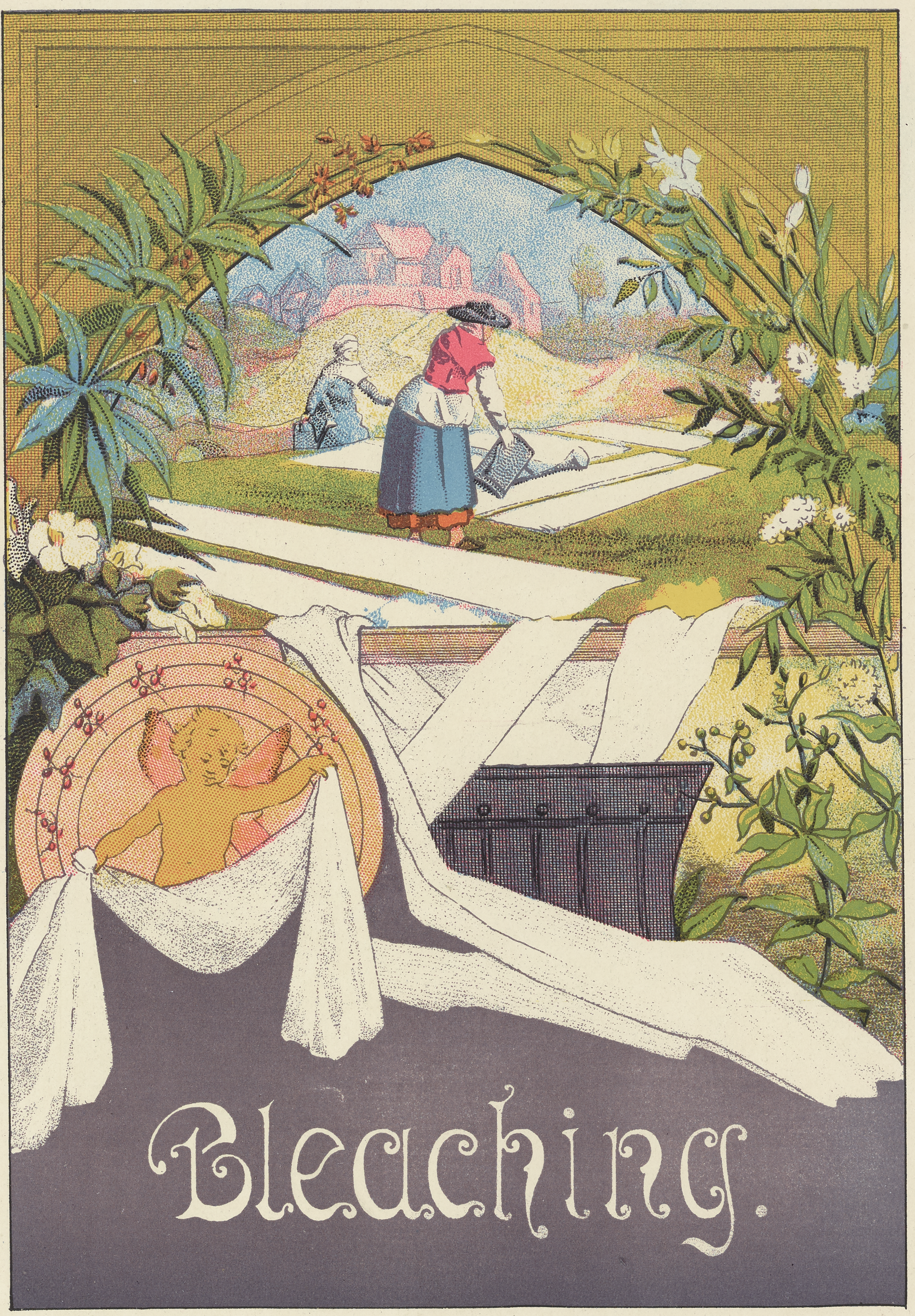
Early method of bleaching cotton and linen goods on lawns

The fabric, when it leaves a loom or knitting machine, is not readily usable. It may be rough, uneven, or have flaws like skewing. Hence, it is necessary to finish the fabric. Finishing techniques enhance the value of the treated fabrics. After manufacturing, textiles undergo a range of finishing procedures, including bleaching, dyeing, printing, as well as mechanical and chemical finishing.

=== Coloration ===
Textiles are often dyed, with fabrics available in almost every colour. The dyeing process often requires several dozen gallons of water for each pound of clothing. Coloured designs in textiles can be created by weaving together fibres of different colours (tartan or Uzbek Ikat), adding coloured stitches to finished fabric (embroidery), creating patterns by resist dyeing methods, tying off areas of cloth and dyeing the rest (tie-dyeing), drawing wax designs on cloth and dyeing in between them (batik), or using various printing processes on finished fabric. Woodblock printing, still used in India and elsewhere today, is the oldest of these dating back to at least 220 CE in China. Textiles are also sometimes bleached, making the textile pale or white.

==== Colour matching ====
In textiles, colour matching extends beyond selecting the appropriate dyestuffs or pigments and combining them in precise proportions to achieve the desired end product colour. Meeting criteria for fastness, cost, and quality is also essential. This process plays a critical role in materializing a designer's concept into an actual product.

=== Finishes ===
Textile finishing is the process of converting the loomstate or raw goods into a useful product, which can be done mechanically or chemically. Finishing is a broad term that refers to a variety of physical and chemical techniques and treatments that finish one stage of textile production while also preparing for the next. Textile finishing can include aspects like improving surface feel, aesthetical enhancement, and adding advanced chemical finishes. A finish is any process that transforms unfinished products into finished products. This includes mechanical finishing and chemical applications which alter the composition of treated textiles (fibre, yarn or fabric.)

Since the 1990s, with advances in technologies such as permanent press process, finishing agents have been used to strengthen fabrics and make them wrinkle free. More recently, nanomaterials research has led to additional advancements, with companies such as Nano-Tex and NanoHorizons developing permanent treatments based on metallic nanoparticles for making textiles more resistant to things such as water, stains, wrinkles, and pathogens such as bacteria and fungi.

Textiles receive a range of treatments before they reach the end-user. From formaldehyde finishes (to improve crease-resistance) to biocidic finishes and from flame retardants to dyeing of many types of fabric, the possibilities are almost endless. However, many of these finishes may also have detrimental effects on the end user. A number of disperse, acid and reactive dyes, for example, have been shown to be allergenic to sensitive individuals. Further to this, specific dyes within this group have also been shown to induce purpuric contact dermatitis.

Eisengarn, meaning "iron yarn" in English, is a light-reflecting, strong material invented in Germany in the 19th century. It is made by soaking cotton threads in a starch and paraffin wax solution. The threads are then stretched and polished by steel rollers and brushes. The result of the process is a lustrous, tear-resistant yarn which is extremely hardwearing.

Finishing techniques
Finishing	Fabrics
Brushing	Carpets, rugs, velvet, velour, and velveteen, referred to as pile fabrics, are made by interlacing a secondary yarn through woven cloth, creating a tufted layer known as a nap or pile.
Shearing	"Shearing machine" is a machine equipped with shearing cylinder, ledger blade, fluff exhaust, and joint seam sensors. The machine operates similarly to a lawn mower. Moleskin and velvet are sheared materials in which pile is cut to a certain level.

== Environmental and health impacts ==
After the oil industry, the fashion industry is the second biggest polluter of agricultural land, which has several harmful impacts on the environment. As the industry grows, the effect on the environment is worsening. Textile manufacturing is one of the oldest and most technologically complicated industries. This industry's fundamental strength stems from its solid manufacturing base of a diverse range of fibres/yarns ranging from natural fibres such as jute, silk, wool, and cotton, to synthetic or manufactured fibres that include polyester, viscose, nylon, and acrylic.

Textile mills and their wastewater have grown in proportion to the increase in demand for textile products, generating a severe pollution concern around the world. Numerous textile industry chemicals pose environmental and health risks. Among the compounds in textile effluent, dyes are considered significant contaminants. Water pollution generated by the discharge of untreated wastewater and the use of toxic chemicals, particularly during processing, account for the majority of the global environmental concerns linked with the textile industry.

=== Environmental impacts ===
Clothing is necessary to meet the fundamental needs of humans. Increased population and living standards have increased the need for clothing, enhancing the demand for textile manufacturing; wet processing needs more water consumption. Conventional machinery and treatment procedures use enormous quantities of water, especially for natural fibres, which require up to 150 kg of water per kg of material. The textile sector is accountable for a substantial number of environmental impacts. However, the discharge of untreated effluents into water bodies is responsible for the majority of environmental harm produced by the textile sector.

The textile sector is believed to use 79 trillion litres of water per year and to discharge around 20% of all industrial effluent into the environment. Reportedly, aromatic and heterocyclic compounds with colour-display and polar groups make up most of the dyes used in textile coloration processes. The structure is more complex and stable, making it more difficult to degrade printing and dyeing wastewater.

In addition, textiles constitute a significant percentage of landfill waste. In 2023, North Carolina State University researchers used enzymes to separate cotton from polyester in an early step towards reducing textile waste, allowing each material to be recycled.

Textiles containing various kinds of plastics like polyesther, polyamide, elastan, polyacrylonitrile, aramid, polypropylene, etc. are also a significant source of environmental pollution and impose health risks through the emission of microplastics.

=== Health impacts ===
Many kinds of respiratory diseases, skin problems, and allergies may be caused by dyes and pigments discharged into the water.

Although formaldehyde levels in clothing are unlikely to be at levels high enough to cause an allergic reaction, due to the presence of such a chemical, quality control and testing are of utmost importance. Flame retardants (mainly in the brominated form) are also of concern where the environment, and their potential toxicity, are concerned.

==== Chemicals use, advantage and health impacts ====
Certain chemical finishes contain potential hazards to health and the environment. Perfluorinated acids are considered to be hazardous to human health by the US Environmental Protection Agency.

Name of the substance	Advantage in textile products	Associated health risks and environmental impacts	References
Perfluorooctanoic acid (PFOA), Polytetrafluoroethylene (Teflon)	Hydrophobic effect	Endocrine disruptor	
Fluorocarbon (PFC)	Hydrophobic effect	May cause respiratory illness	
Bromine	Brominated flame retardant	Persistent, bioaccumulative and toxic substances may cause neurobehavioral disorders and endocrine disruption	
Silver, silver nanoparticle	Antimicrobial resistance	Environmental impact of silver nanoparticles and toxic effects on human health	

==== Testing ====
Testing for these additives is possible at a number of commercial laboratories. It is also possible to have textiles tested according to the Oeko-tex certification standard, which contains limits levels for the use of certain chemicals in textiles products.

== Laws and regulations ==
Different countries have certain laws and regulations to protect consumers' interests. The Textile Fiber Products Identification Act is a law that protects consumers in the United States. The act protects producer and consumer interests by implementing labelling (required content disclosure) and advertising requirements on textile products. The Textile Fiber Products Identification Act applies to all textile fibre products besides wool, which is governed by the Wool Product Label Number. The law prohibits misinformation about the fibre content, misbranding, and any unfair advertising practice, as well as requires businesses to operate in a particular manner.

== Testing of textiles ==
Testing occurs at various stages of the textile manufacturing process, from raw material to finished product. The purpose of testing is to evaluate and analyse the regulatory compliance, the product's quality and performance, as well as to measure its specifications. Textile testing encompasses a wide range of methodologies, procedures, equipment, and sophisticated laboratories. Local governments and authorized organization's such as ASTM International, International Organization for Standardization, and American Association of Textile Chemists and Colorists establish standards for testing of textiles.

Some examples of tests at different stages:

For fibre: Fibre identification is a necessary test for determining fibre content and classifying products. The labelling of items with their fibre content percentage is a regulatory requirement. Using microscopy, solubility, and burn tests, fibres are distinguished from one another. More fibre relating tests include fibre length, diameter, Micronaire.

For yarn: Yarn count, denier, Strength, evenness.

For fabric: Dimensional stability, colour fastness, thread count, G.S.M, pilling, flammability.

== Picture gallery ==
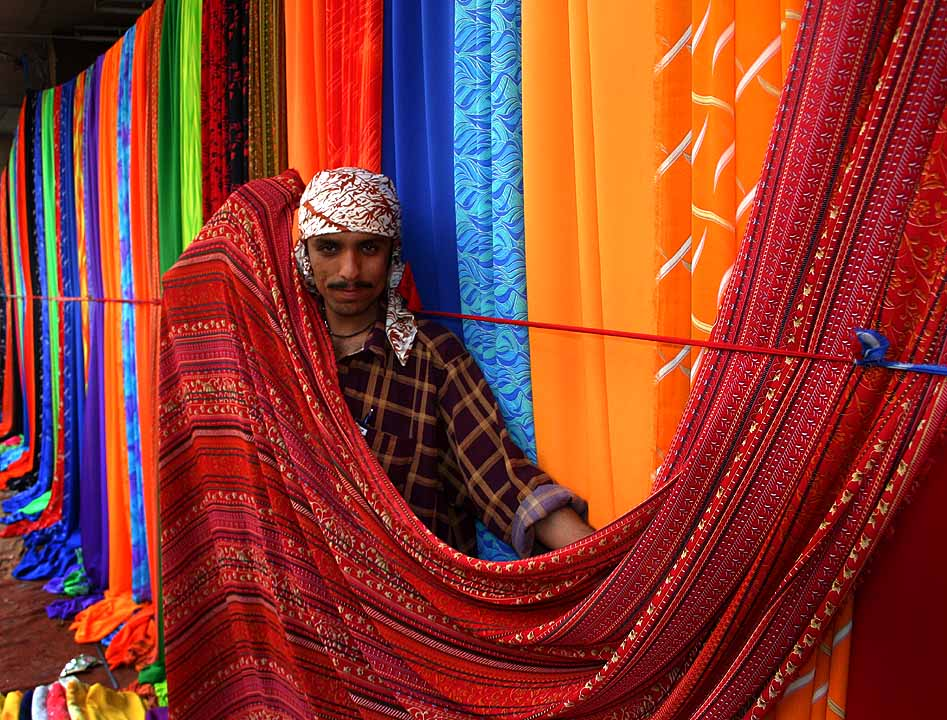
Textile market on the sidewalks of Karachi, Pakistan

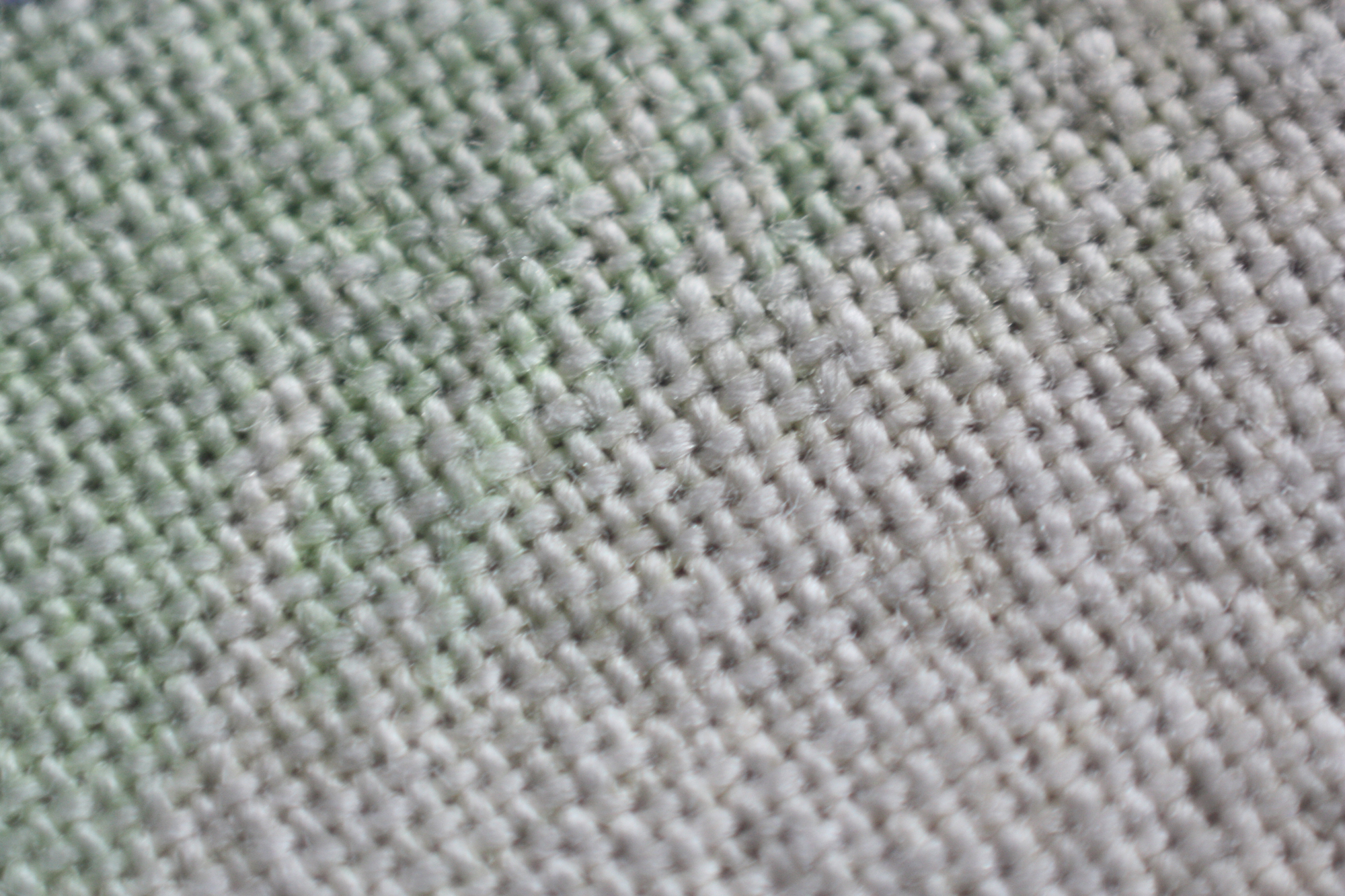
Magnified view of a plain or tabby weave textile

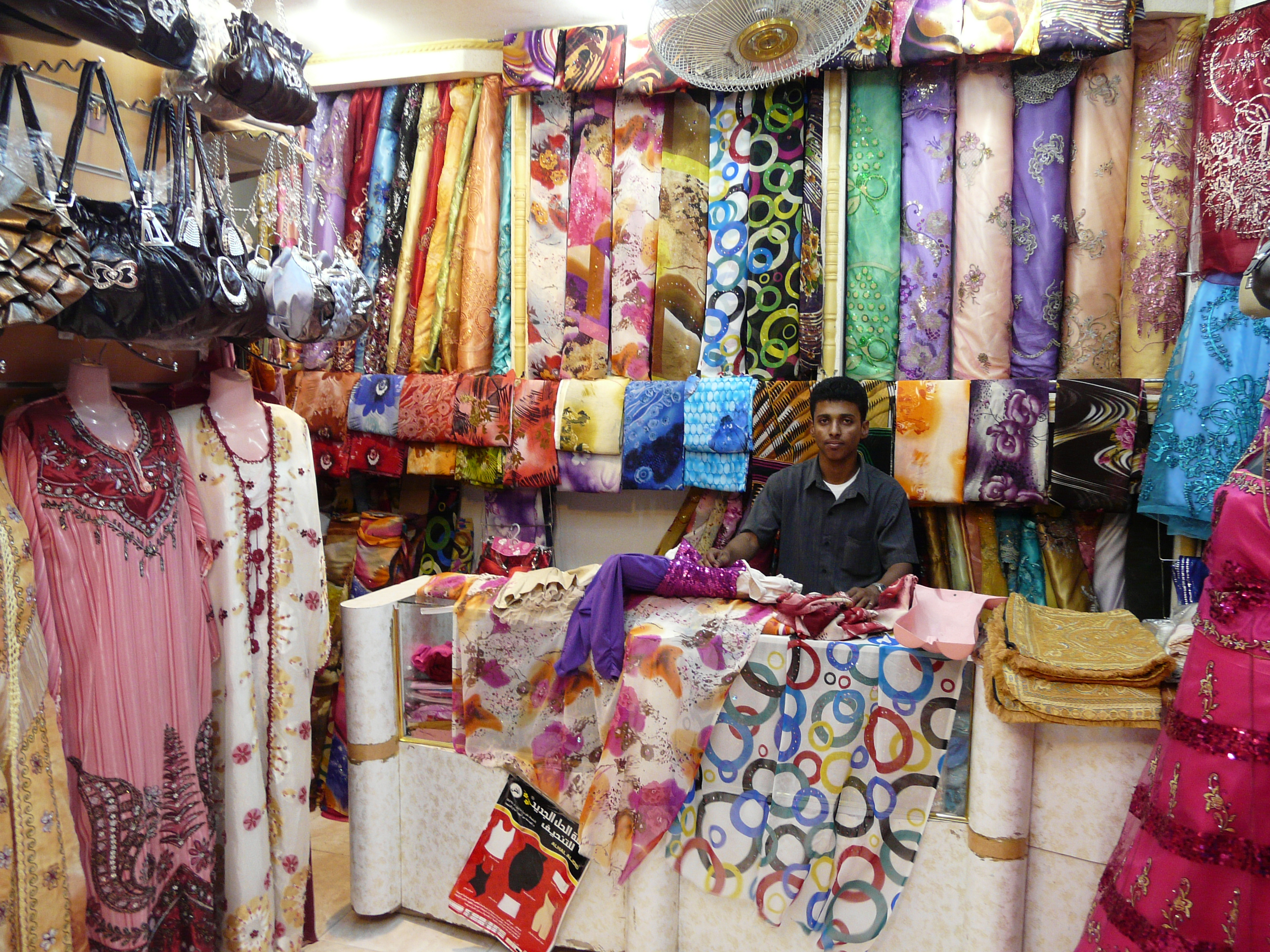
Fabric shop in canal town Mukalla, Yemen

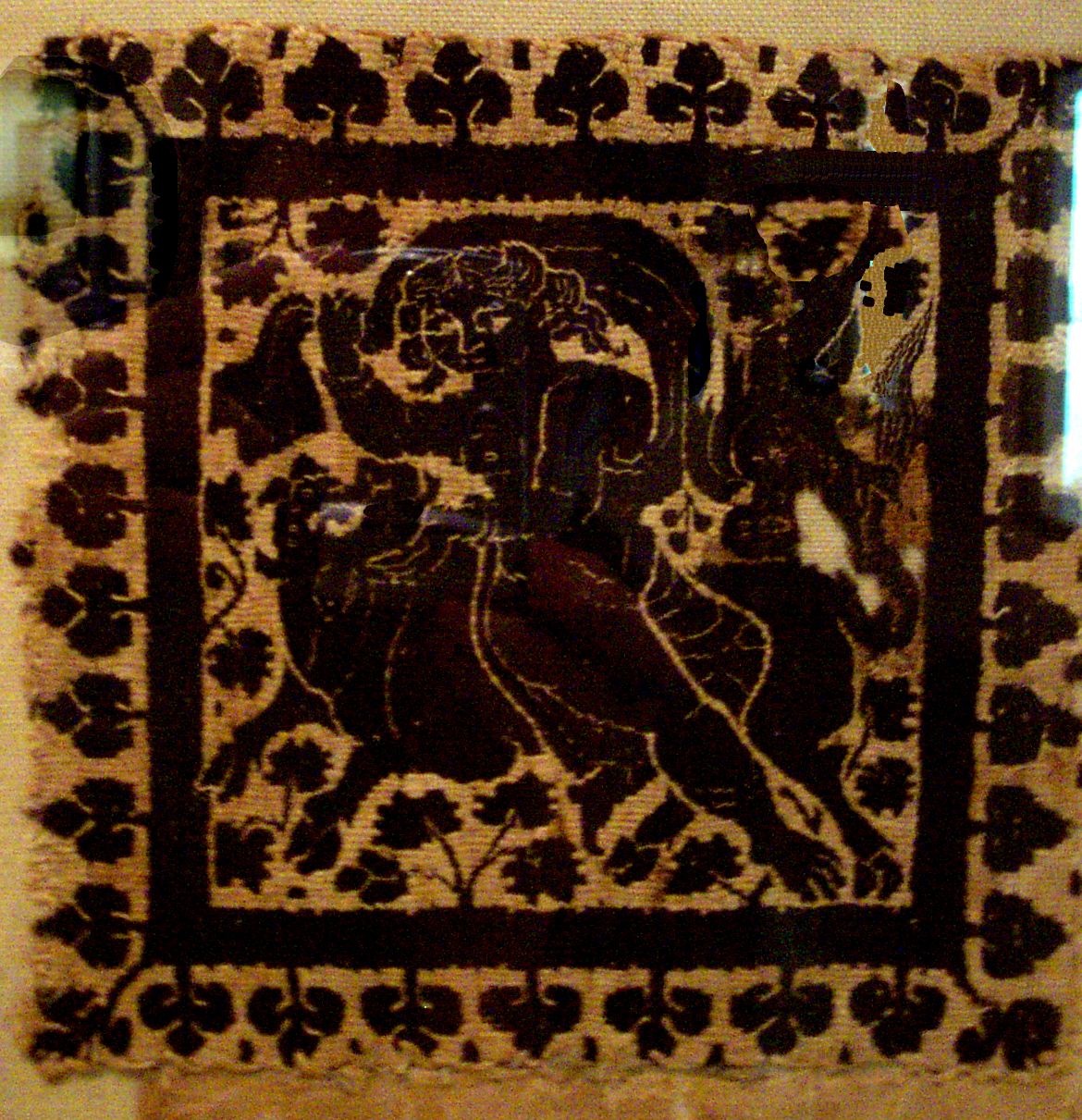
Late antique textile, Egyptian, now in the Dumbarton Oaks collection

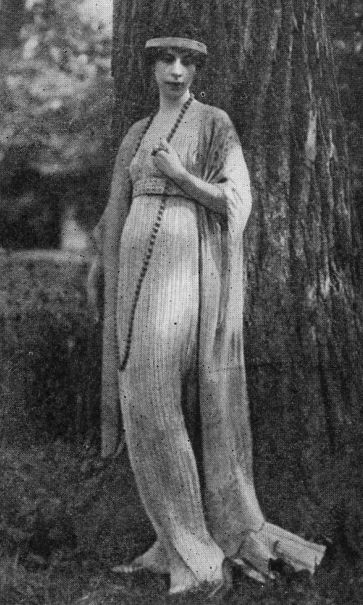
Mrs. Condé Nast wearing a silk Fortuny tea gown

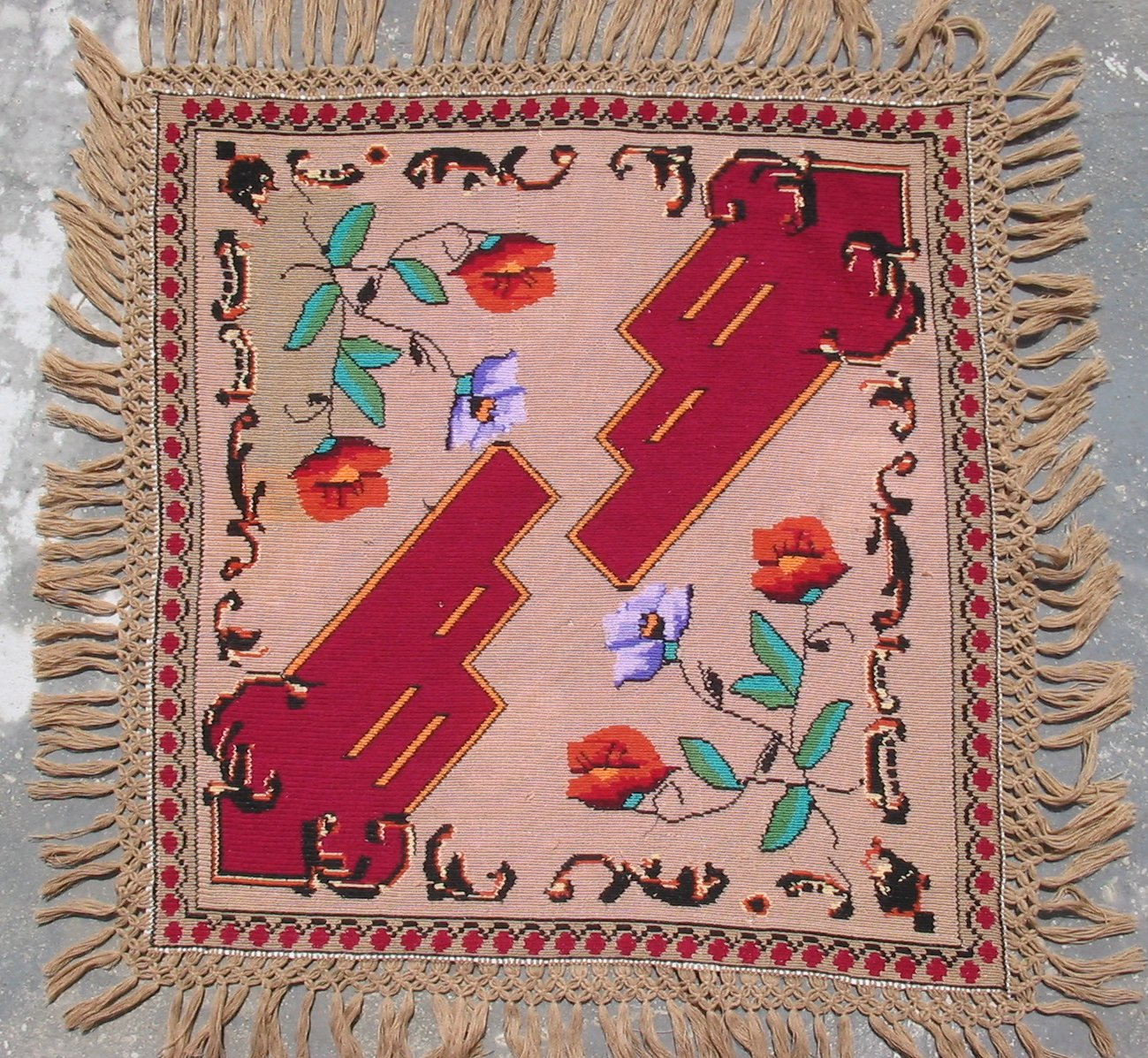
Traditional tablecloth, Maramureș, Romania

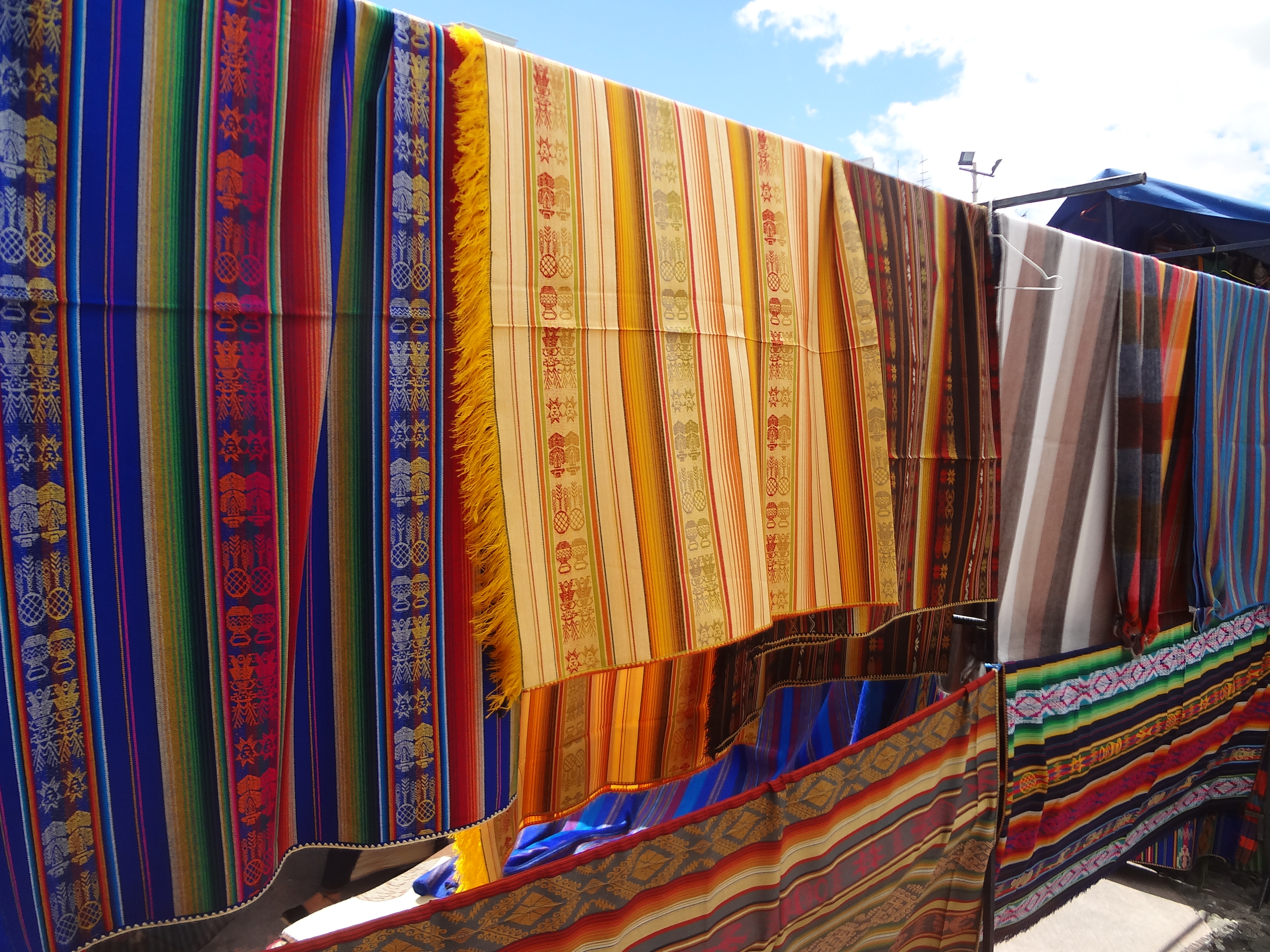
Textiles made from Alpaca wool at the Otavalo Artisan Market in the Andes Mountains, Ecuador

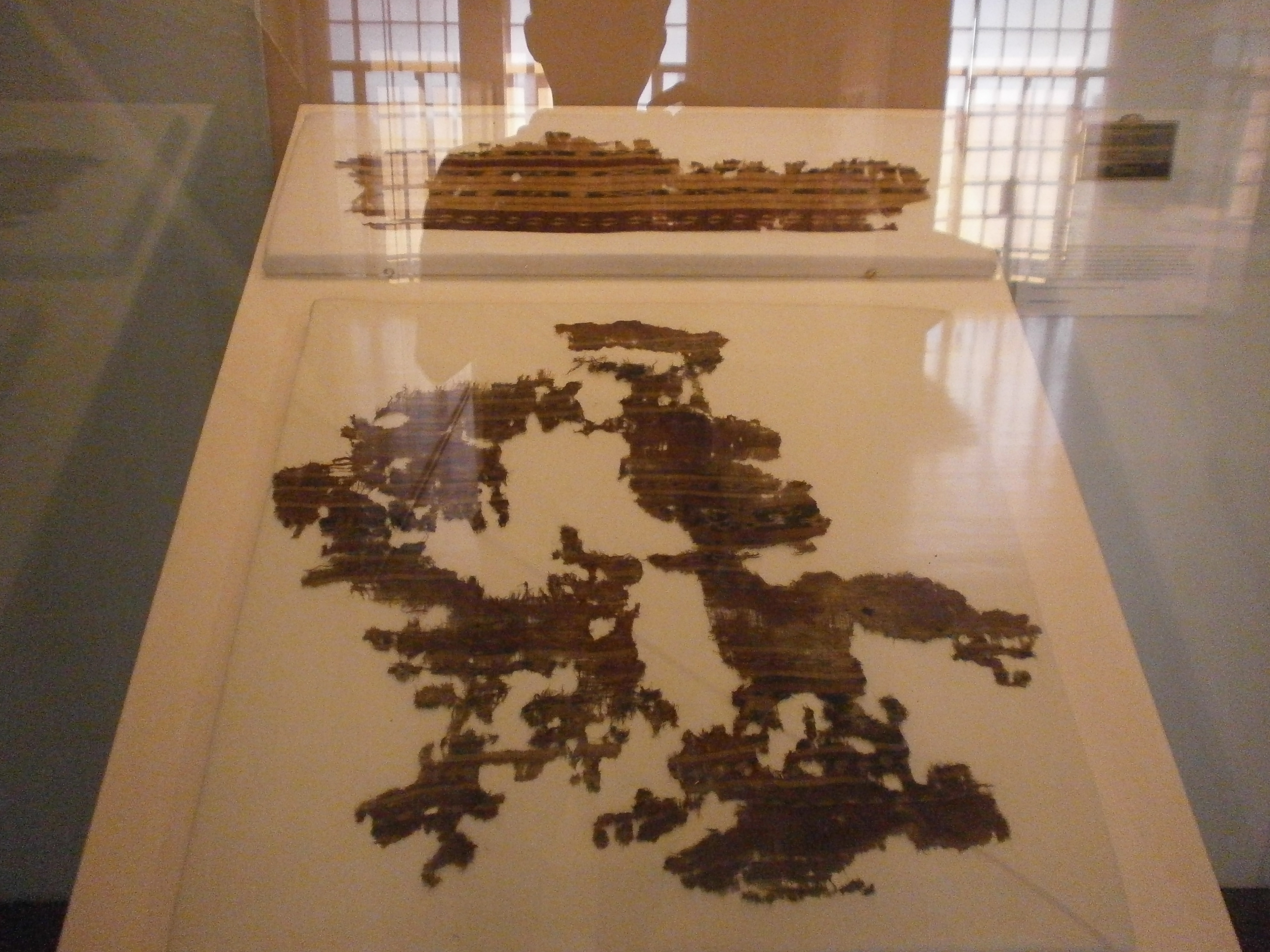
The Banton Burial Cloth, the oldest existing example of warp ikat in Southeast Asia, displayed at the National Museum of the Philippines. The cloth was most likely made by the native Asia people of northwest Romblon.

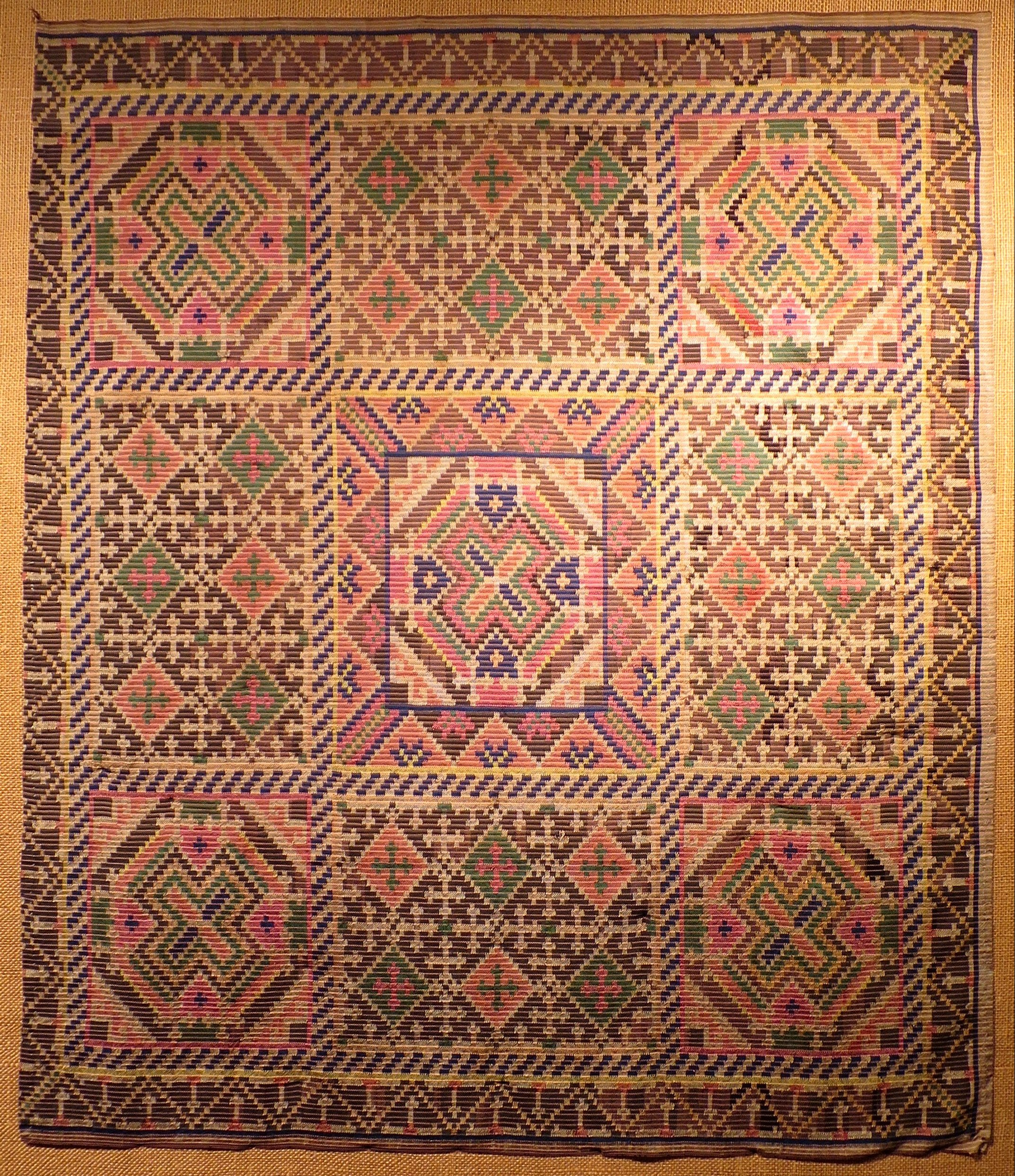
A double ikat weaving made by the Tausug people from Sulu, made of banana leaf stalk fibre (Abacá)

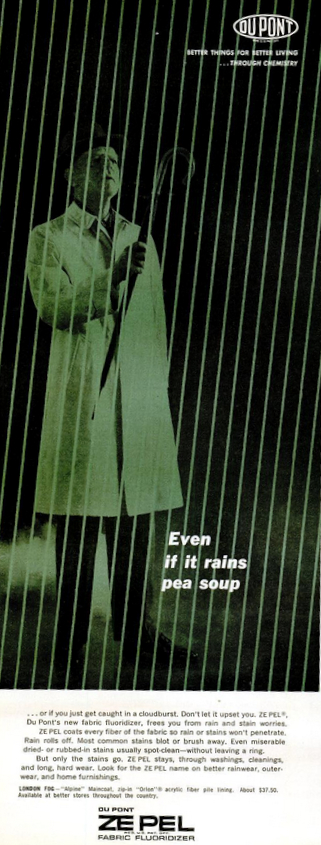
Advertisement for Zepel, the trade name used to market Teflon as a fabric treatment

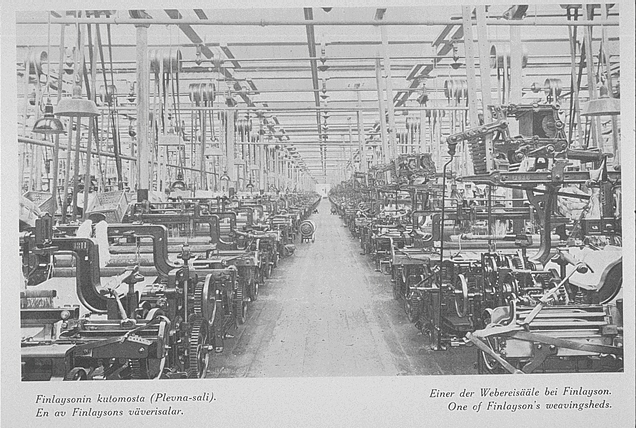
A weaving shed of the Finlayson & Co factory in Tampere, Finland, in 1932

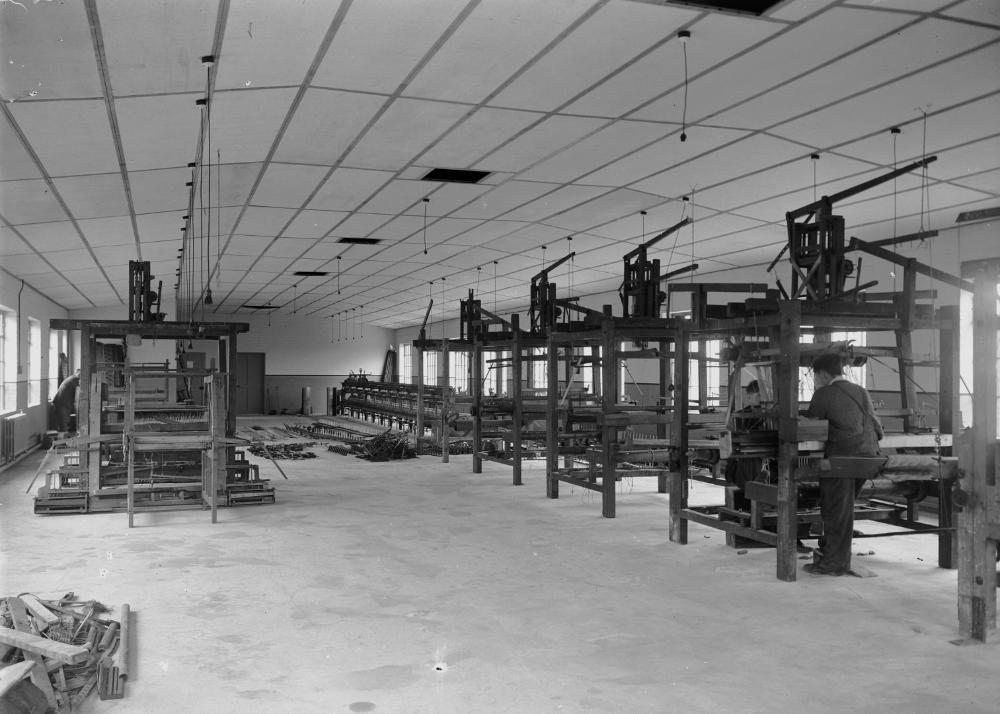
Textile machinery at the Cambrian Factory, Llanwrtyd, Wales, in the 1940s

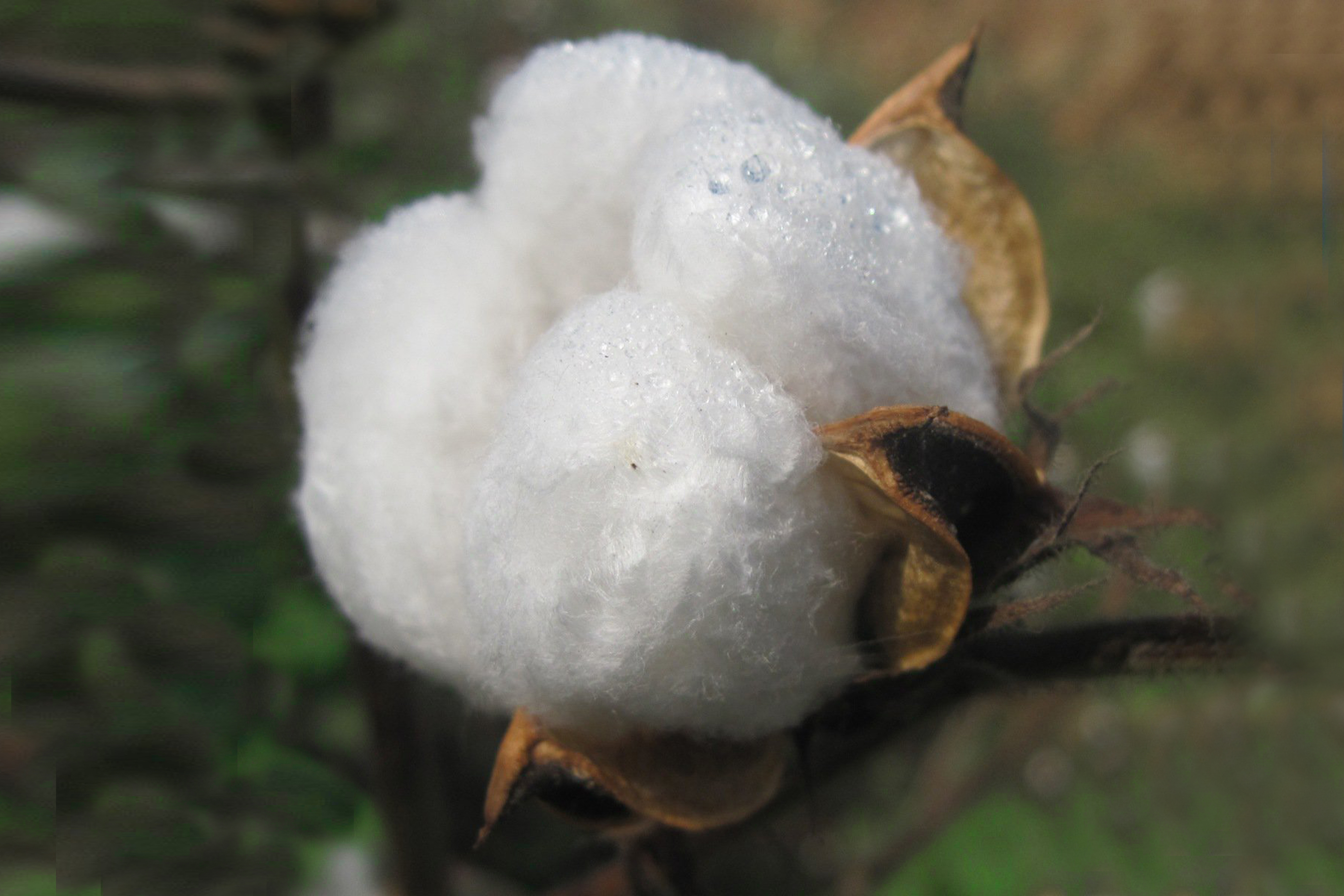
Cotton fibre

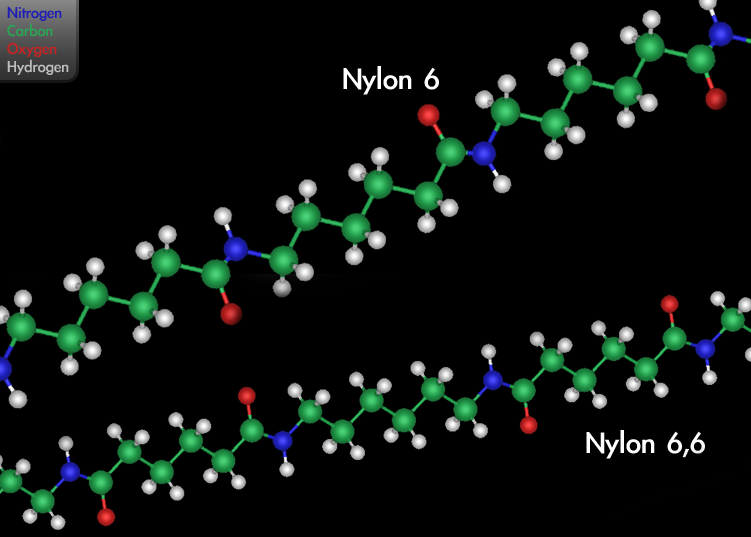
Nylon

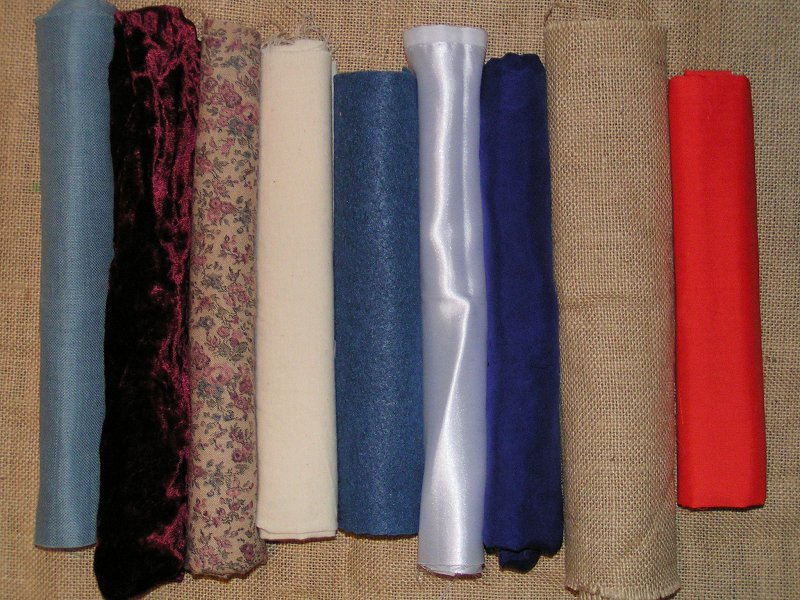
A variety of contemporary fabrics. From the left: evenweave cotton, velvet, printed cotton, calico, felt, satin, silk, hessian, polycotton.

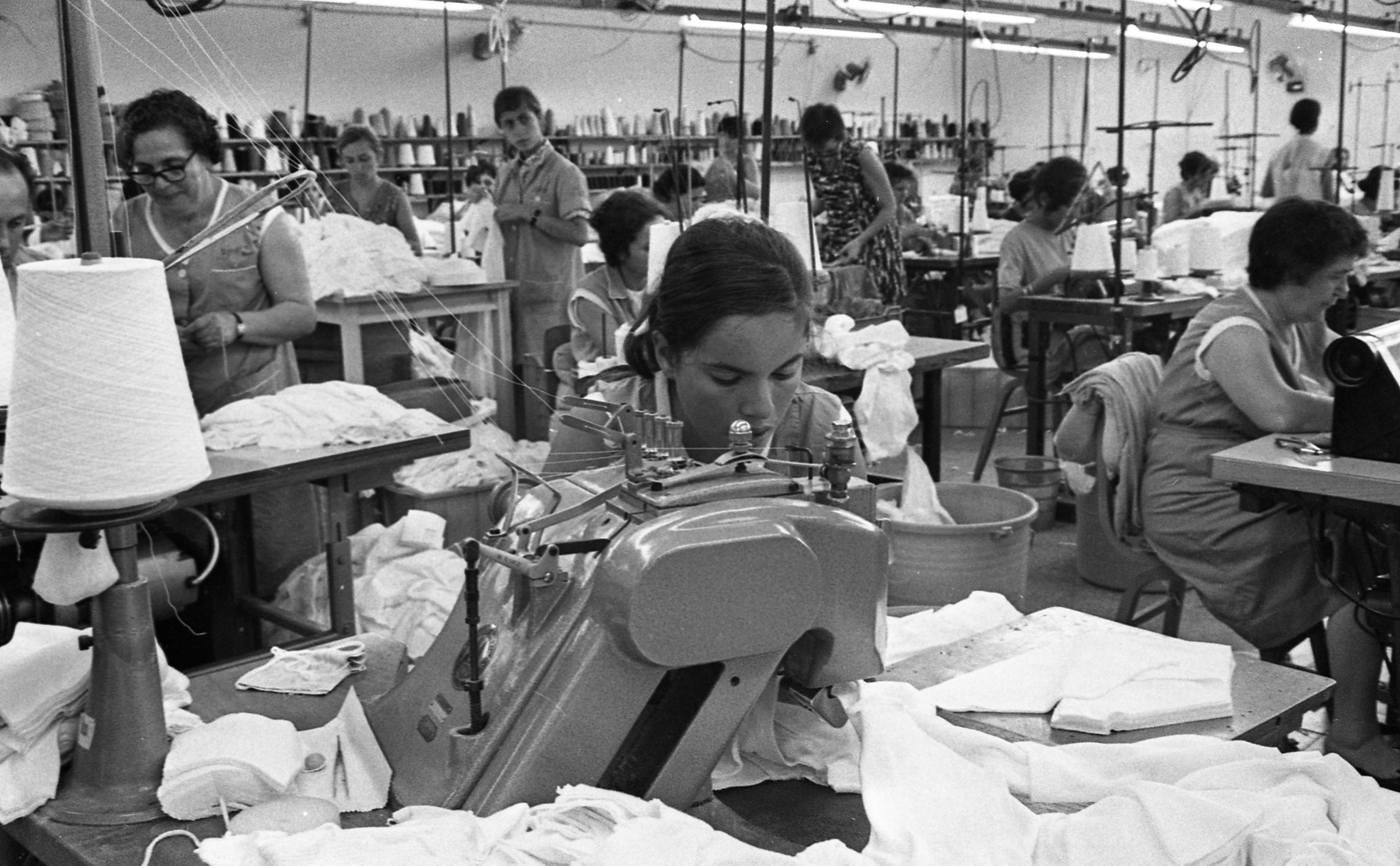
A textile factory in Israel, 1969

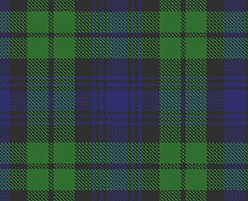
Woven tartan of Clan Campbell, Scotland

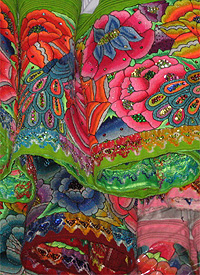
Embroidered skirts by the Alfaro-Nùñez family of Cochas, Peru, using traditional Peruvian embroidery methods

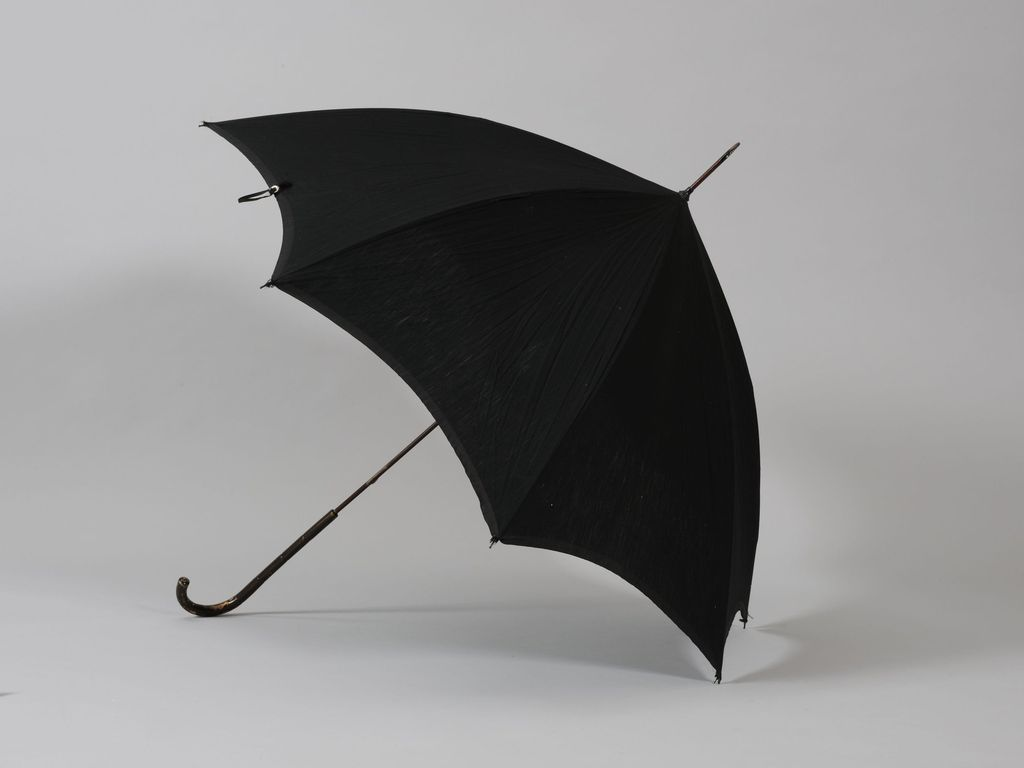
A modern umbrella fabric has specific requirements for colour fastness to light, water and wet rubbing, and permeability.

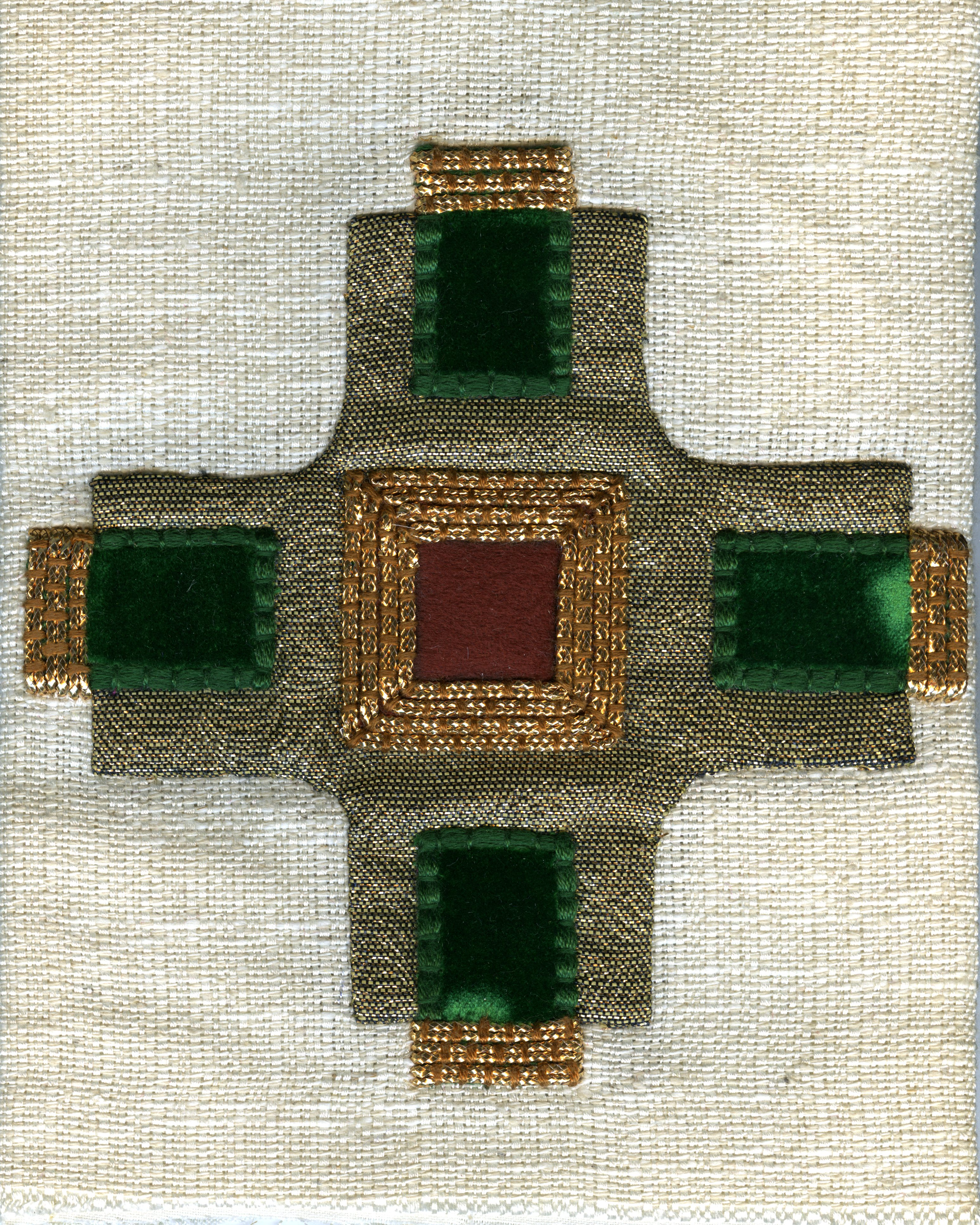
Appliqué cross. The edges are covered and stitches are hidden. It is overlaid with decorative gold thread.

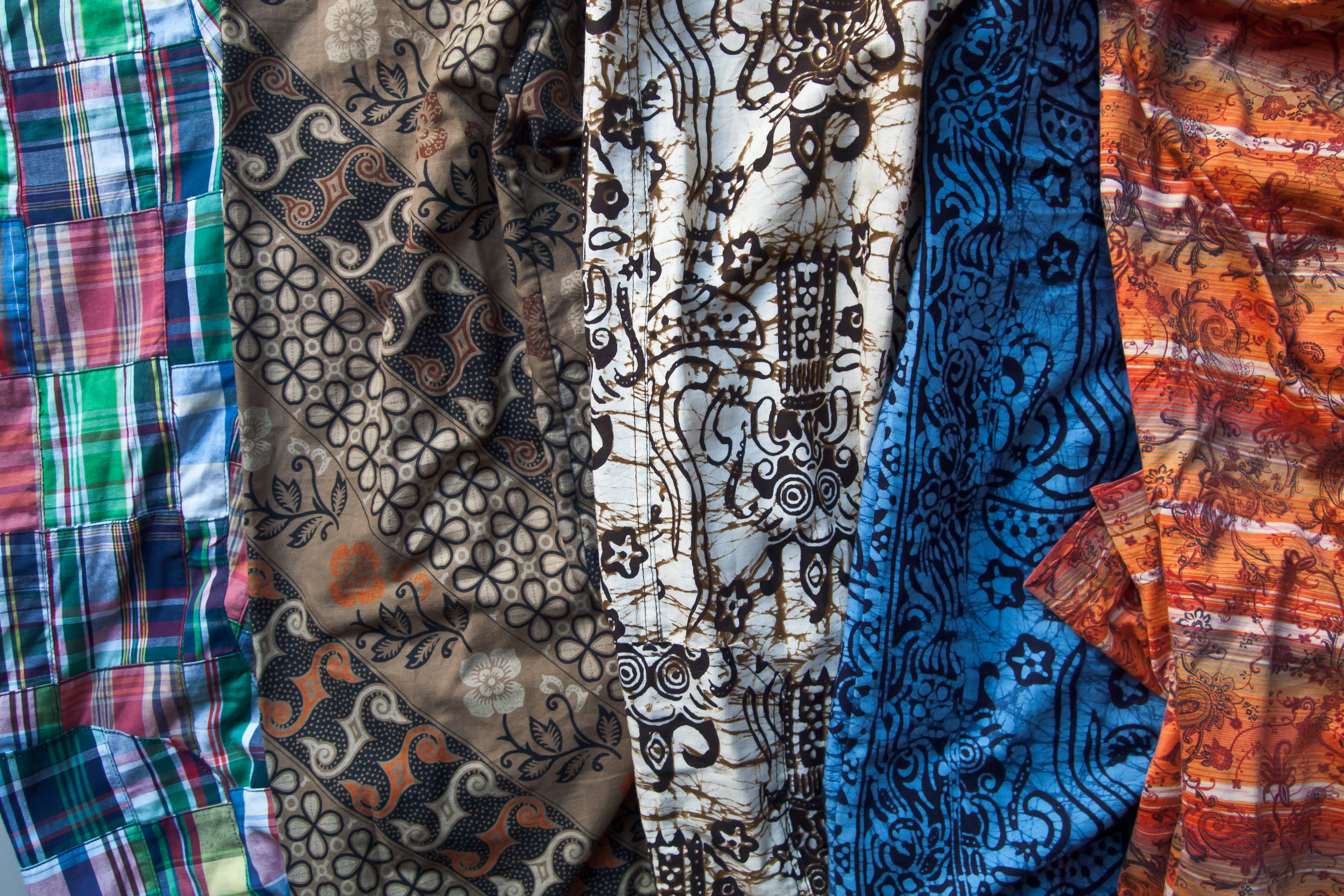
Clothing made of textiles, Thailand

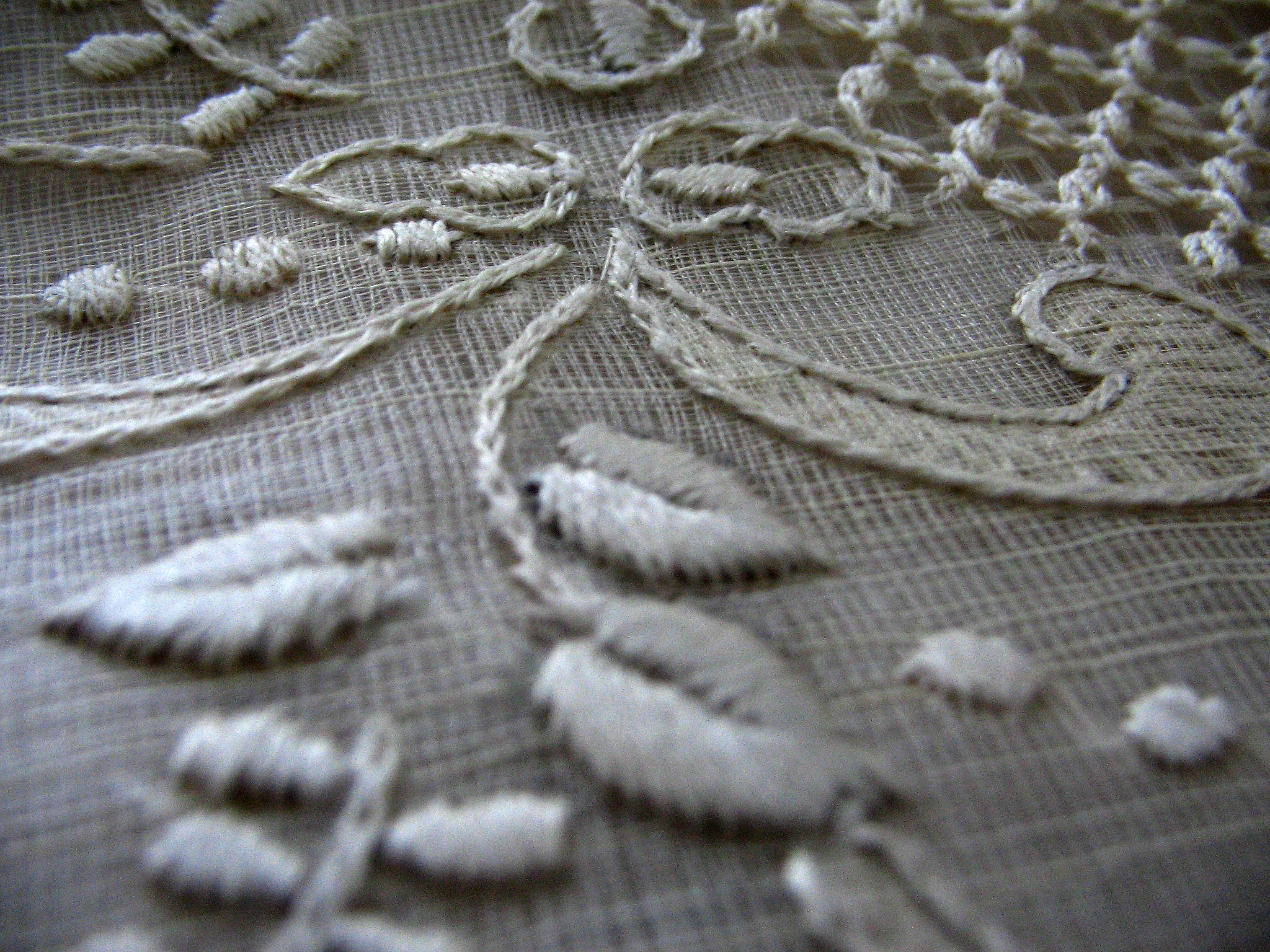
Close-up view of a barong tagalog made with piña fibre in the Philippines

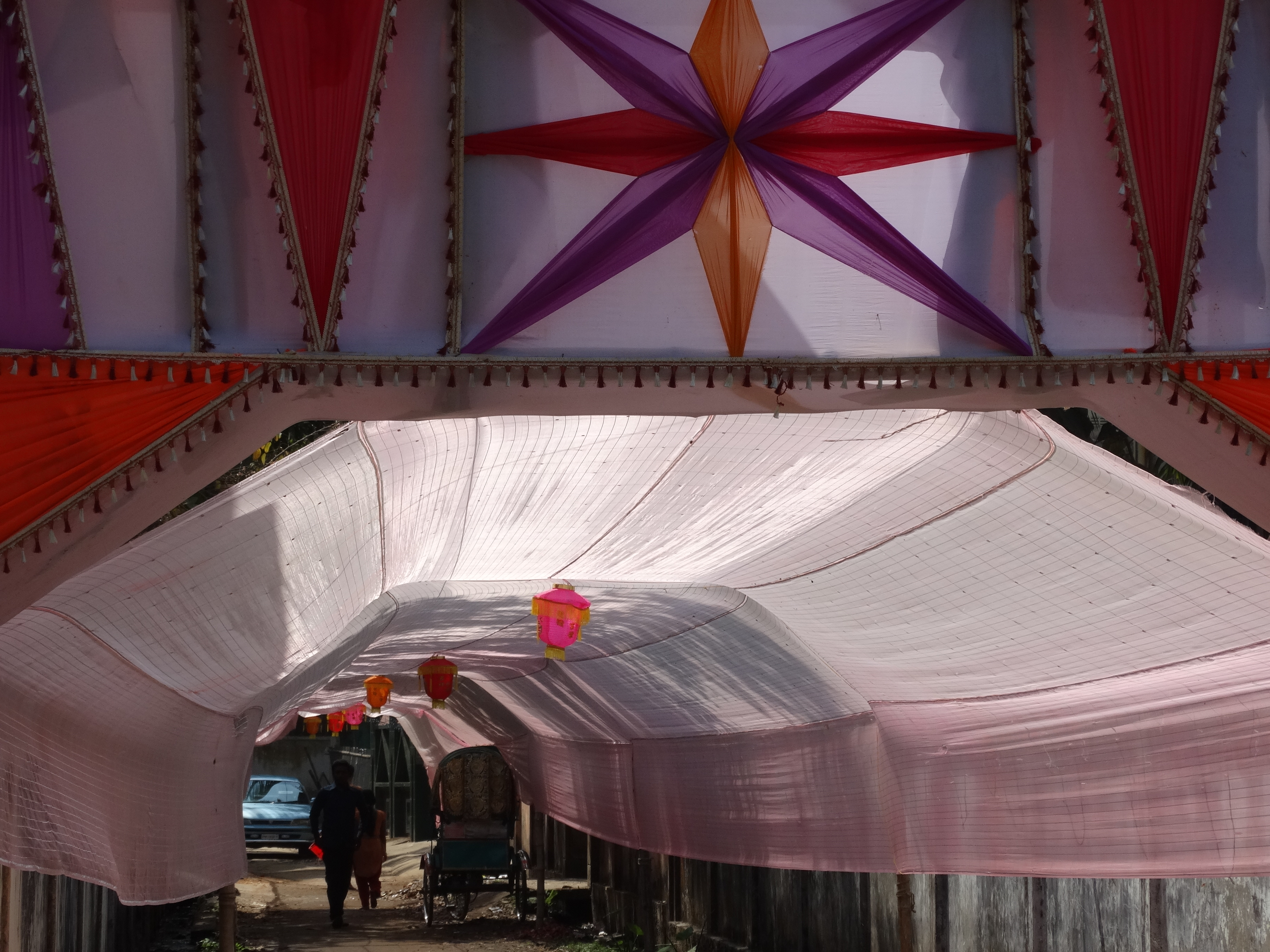
A fabric tunnel in Moulvibazar District, Bangladesh

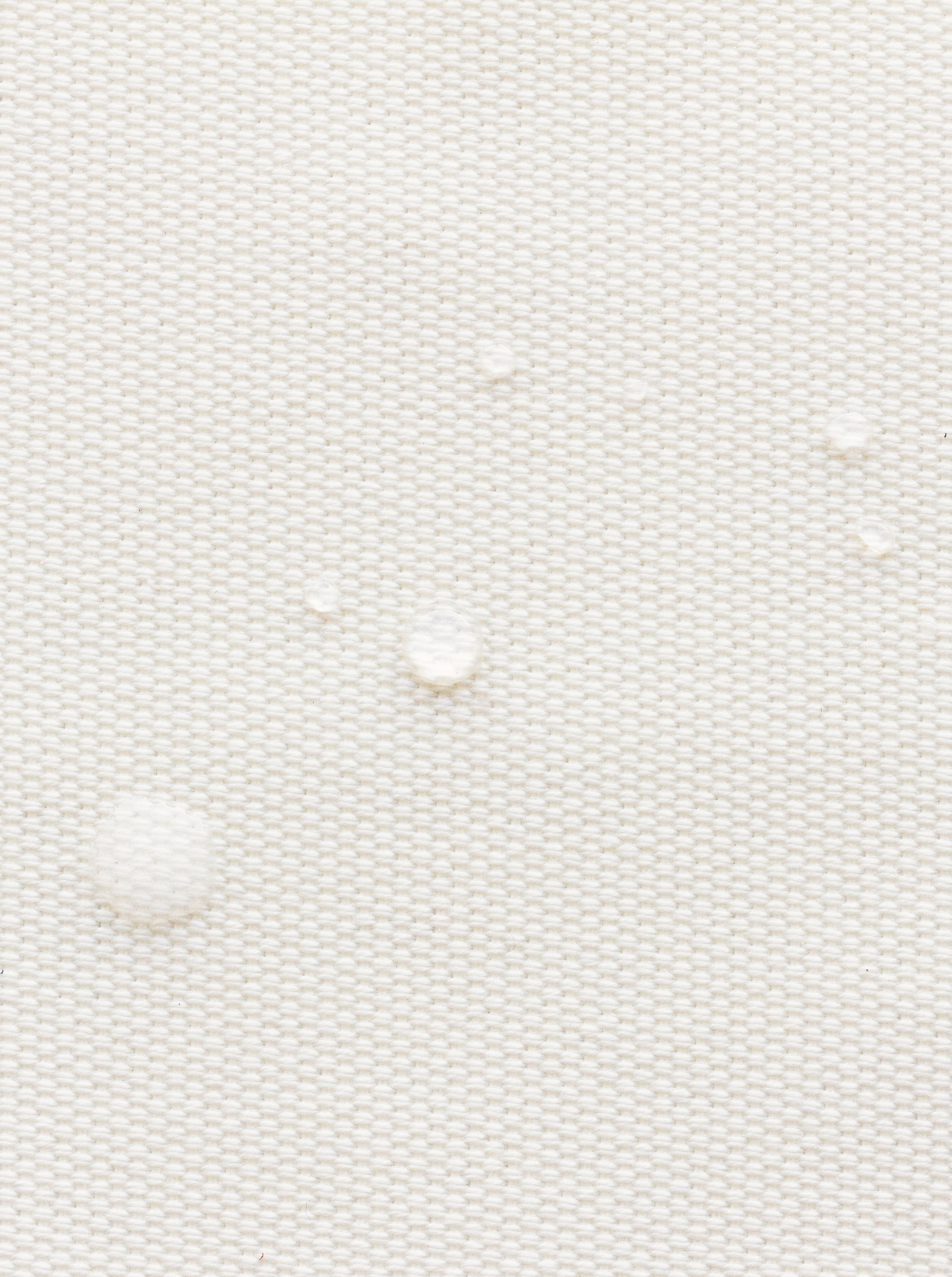
A modern Manila hemp made on industrial weaving machines

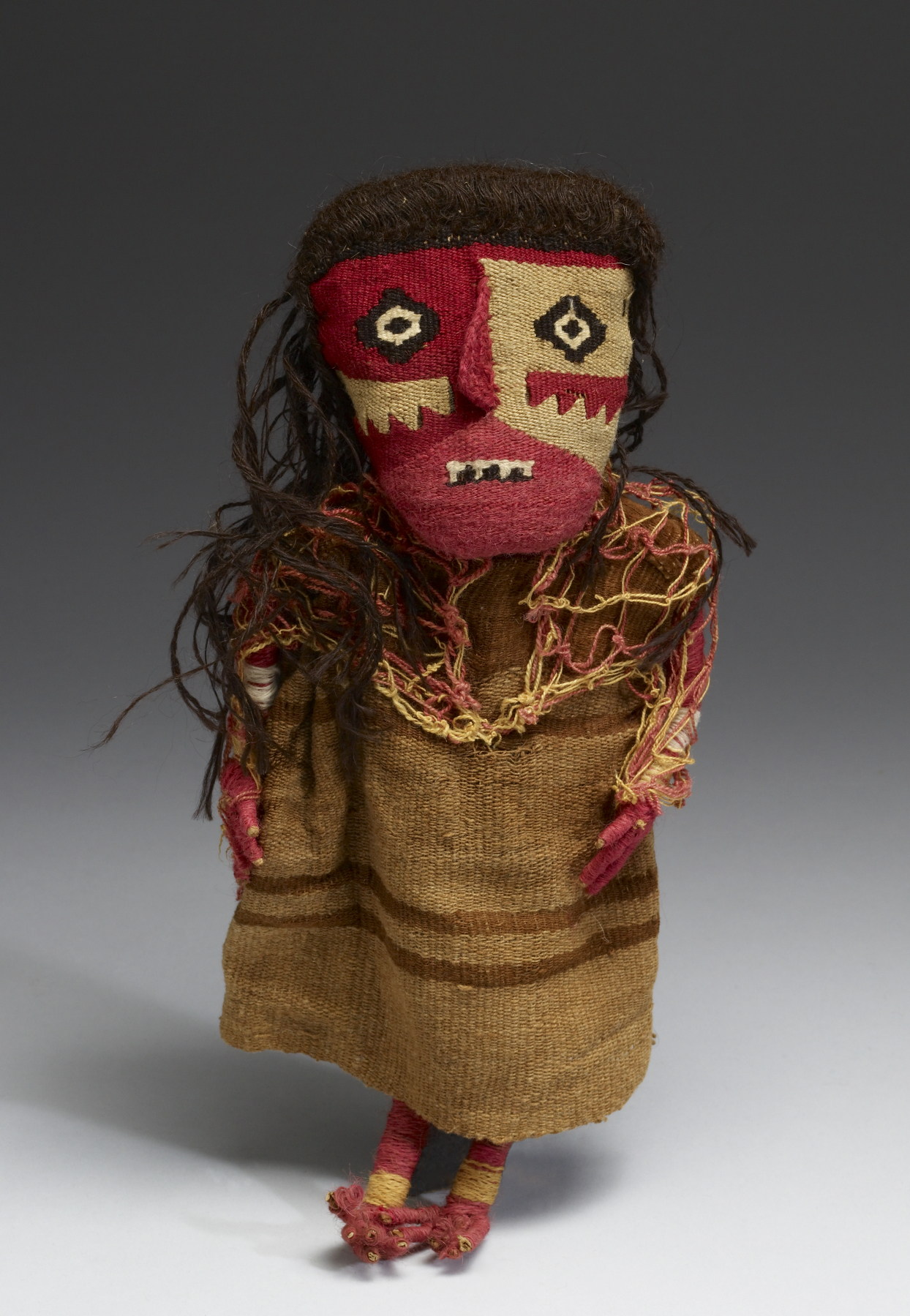
Textile doll (11th century), Chancay culture, found near Lima, Walters Art Museum. Of their small size, dolls are frequently found in ancient Peruvian tombs.

Textile designers, R. M. Hoskins Pty. Ltd., Sydney, 1941, State Library of New South Wales

== See also ==
- Bamboo textile – Textile made from various parts of the bamboo plant
- Clothing in the ancient world – What people wore in antiquity as inferred from archaeological and historical evidence
- Green textile – Textiles or fibers produced sustainably
- International Down and Feather Testing Laboratory
- List of textile fibres
- Sustainable fashion – Reduction of environmental impacts of the fashion industry
- Technical textile – Textile product valued for its functional characteristics
- Textile arts – Form of arts and crafts using fibers
- Textile manufacturing – Industry which produces textiles
  - Glossary of textile manufacturing
- Textile printing – Method for applying patterns to cloth using printing techniques
- Textile recycling – Method of reusing or reprocessing used clothing, fibrous material and rags
- Timeline of clothing and textiles technology

== Sources ==
- Birrell, Verla Leone (1973). The textile arts: a handbook of weaving, braiding, printing, and other textile techniques. New York: Schocken Books. ISBN 978-0-8052-0390-5.
- Chapman, R. (2010). Applications of Nonwovens in Technical Textiles. Elsevier Science. ISBN 978-1-84569-437-1.
- Smith, Betty F. (1982). Textiles in perspective. Englewood Cliffs, N.J.: Prentice-Hall. ISBN 978-0-13-912808-0.
- Joseph, Marjory L. (1977). Introductory textile science. New York : Holt: Rinehart and Winston. ISBN 978-0-03-089970-6.
- Kadolph, Sara J. (1998). Textiles. Upper Saddle River, N.J.: Merrill. ISBN 978-0-13-494592-7.
- Elsasser, Virginia Hencken (2005). Textiles: concepts and principles. New York, NY: Fairchild Publications. ISBN 978-1-56367-300-9.
- Weibel, Adèle Coulin (1952). Two thousand years of textiles; the figured textiles of Europe and the Near East. New York: Pantheon Books.
- Humphries, Mary (1996). Fabric reference. Upper Saddle River, N.J.: Prentice Hall. ISBN 978-0-13-349671-0.
