= Alpaca fiber =

Natural fiber

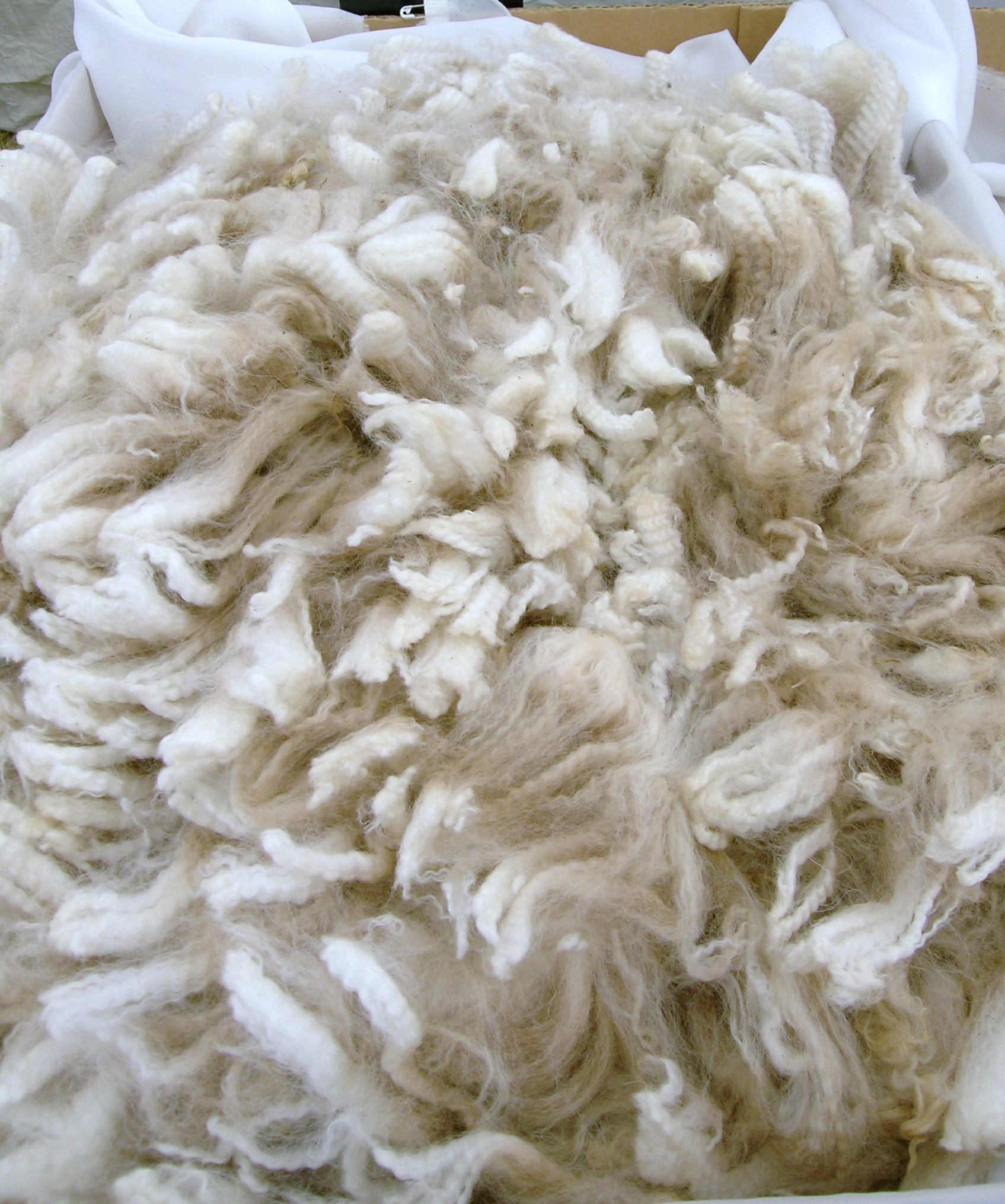
Alpaca fleece, Wool Expo, Armidale, NSW

Spinning alpaca wool by Treadle wheel, Gotthard Pass, 2018.

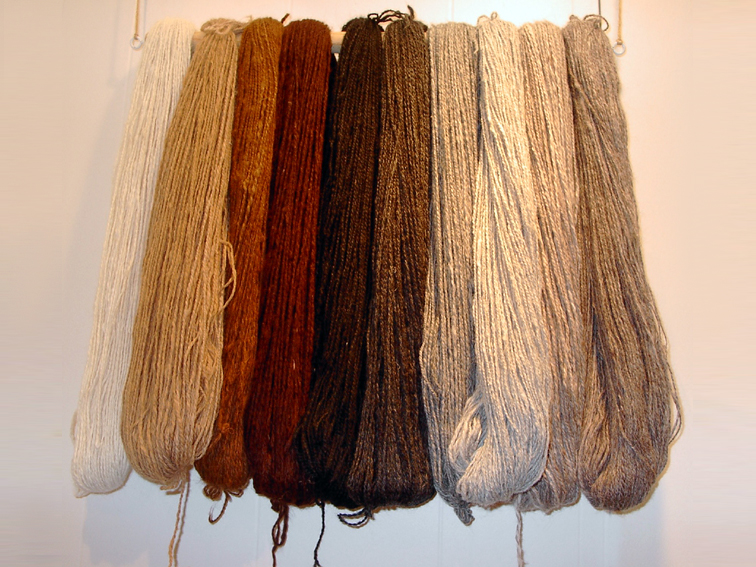
Yarn spun from alpaca wool.

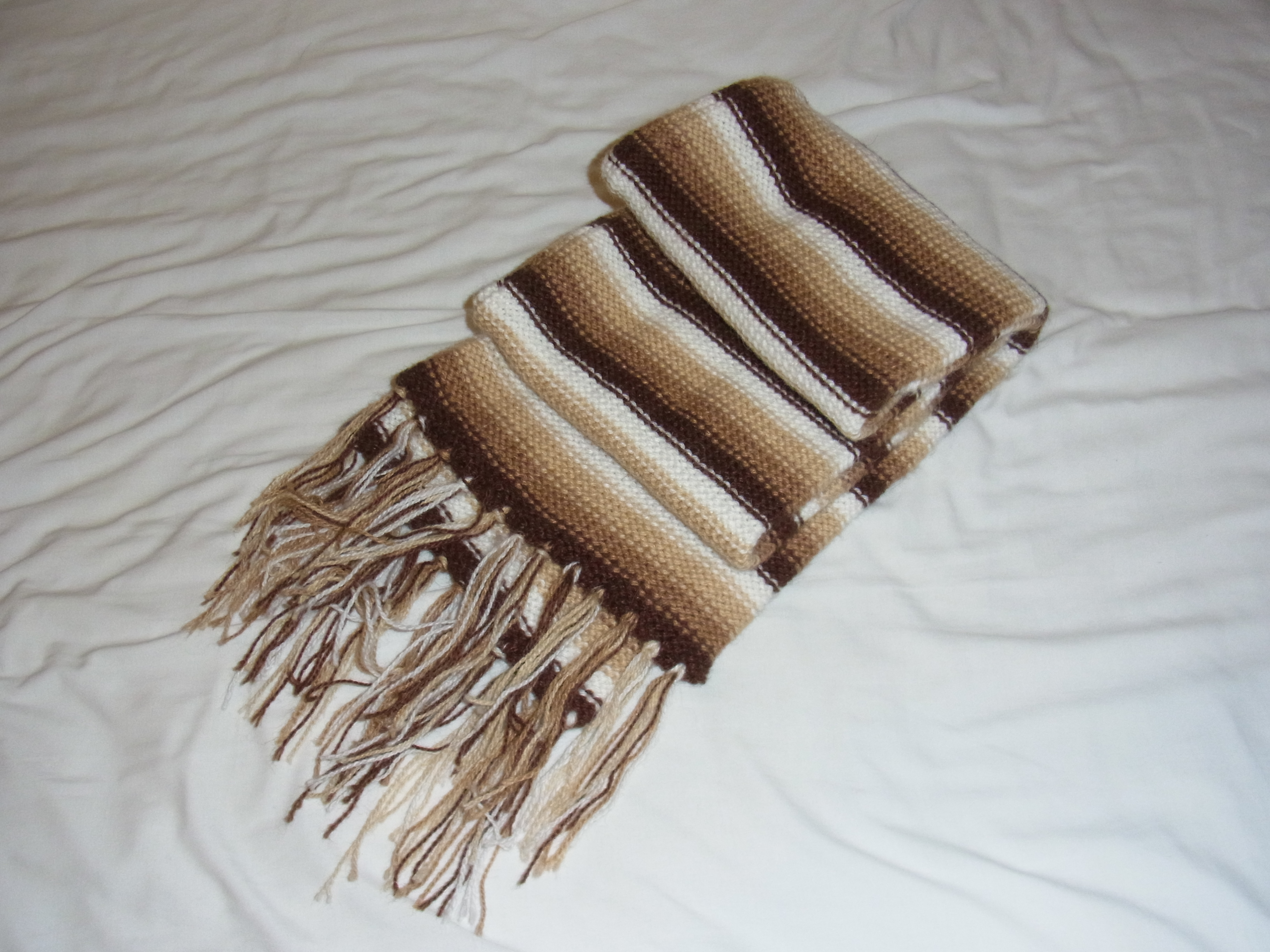
Alpaca scarf. Cambridge Food, Garden and Produce Festival, England

Alpaca fleece is the natural fiber harvested from an alpaca. There are two different types of alpaca fleece. The most common fleece type comes from a Huacaya. Soft, spongy Huacaya fiber grows and looks similar to sheep wool in that the animal looks "fluffy". The second type of alpaca is Suri and makes up less than 10% of the South American alpaca population. Suri fiber is more similar to natural silk and hangs off the body in locks that have a dreadlock appearance. While both fibers can be used in the worsted milling process using light weight yarn or thread, Huacaya fiber can also be used in a woolen process and spun into various weight yarns. It is a soft, durable, luxurious, silky fiber.

While huacaya fiber is similar to sheep's wool, it is warmer, not prickly, and has no lanolin, which makes it hypoallergenic. Alpaca fiber is naturally water-repellent and fire resistant. Huacaya fiber has natural crimp, thus making a naturally elastic yarn well-suited for knitting. Suri has no crimp and thus is a better fit for woven goods. The designer Giorgio Armani has used Suri alpaca to fashion men's and women's suits. In the United States, groups of smaller alpaca breeders have banded together to create "fiber co-ops," to make the manufacture of alpaca fiber products less expensive.

The preparing, carding, spinning, weaving and finishing process of alpaca is very similar to the process used for wool.

== Alpacas ==
=== Types ===
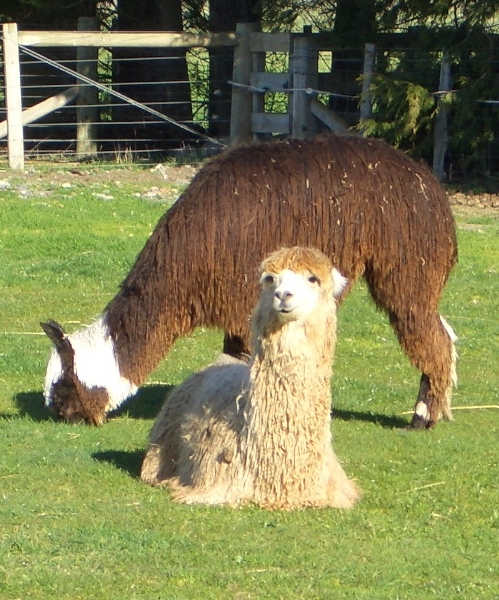
Suri alpaca

There are two types of alpaca: Huacaya, which produce a dense, soft, crimpy sheep-like fiber, and Suri, with silky pencil-like locks, resembling dreadlocks but without matted fibers. Suris, prized for their longer and silkier fibers, are estimated to make up 19–20% of the North American alpaca population. Since their importation into the United States, Suri alpacas have grown in number substantially and become more color diverse. The Suri is thought to be rarer, most likely because the breed was reserved for royalty during Incan times. Suris are often said to be less cold hardy than Huacaya, but both breeds are successfully raised in more extreme climates. They were developed in South America.

=== History ===
Alpacas have been bred in Pre-Columbian South America for over 5,000 years. They were domesticated from the vicuñas by the ancient tribes of the Andean highlands of Ecuador, Peru, Chile, Bolivia and Northwest of Argentina. According to archaeological studies alpaca fiber was similar in quality to the wild vicuña prior to the Spanish Conquests in the 1500s. 2,000–year-old Paracas textiles are thought to include alpaca fiber. Also known as "The Fiber of the gods", Alpaca was used to make clothing for royalty. In recent years, alpacas have also been exported to other countries. In countries such as the US, Australia and New Zealand, breeders shear their animals annually, weigh the fleeces and test them for fineness. With the resulting knowledge, they are able to breed heavier-fleeced animals with finer fiber. Fleece weights vary, with the top stud males reaching annual shear weights up to 7 kg total fleece and 3 kg good quality fleece. The discrepancy in weight is because an alpaca has guard hair, which is often removed before spinning.

== Alpaca fiber ==
=== Production ===
Alpacas are shorn once a year in spring. After shearing, the fleece is roughly cleaned and sorted according to color. The dried wool is then carded; in this process, the loose alpaca fibers are aligned into a strain of Alpaca fleece with a carding machine's help.

Like sheep, alpacas have thicker awn hairs. These long straight hairs located between the undercoat ensure that the fine coat does not become matted. Therefore alpacas should not be brushed; this would destroy their undercoat structure. The awn hairs are much coarser than the fine undercoat, and can be carded easily, but they can also be sorted out.

After carding, the strains are ready to be spun into yarn with a spinning wheel. Finally, the wool should be washed to remove impurities. Alpaca wool contains almost no wool grease (lanolin), making it easy to clean. The wool is then ready for sale as knitting wool or for further processing.

=== Industry history ===
The Amerindians of Peru used this fiber in the manufacture of many styles of fabrics for thousands of years before its introduction into Europe as a commercial product. The alpaca was a crucial component of ancient life in the Andes, as it provided not only warm clothing, but also meat.

Incan culture involved the alpaca, as well as llamas and guanacos, in ritual sacrifice. Slaughter methods varied by the god receiving the sacrifice, the festival during which it took place, and even the color of the animal's fur. One method involved slitting open the animal's left side and reaching inside the chest cavity to remove the heart.

The first European importations of alpaca fiber were into Spain. Spain transferred that fiber to Germany and France. Apparently, alpaca yarn was spun in England for the first time about 1808, but the fiber was condemned as an unworkable. In 1830, Benjamin Outram, of Greetland, near Halifax, appears to have reattempted spinning it, and again it was condemned. These two attempts failed because of the style of fabric into which the yarn was woven—a type of camlet. With the introduction of cotton warps into Bradford trade about 1836, the true qualities of alpaca could be assessed as it was developed into fabric. It is not known where the cotton warp and mohair or alpaca weft plain-cloth came from, but it was this structure which enabled Titus Salt, then a young Bradford manufacturer, to use alpaca successfully. The typical "alpaca fabric" is a very characteristic "dress fabric."

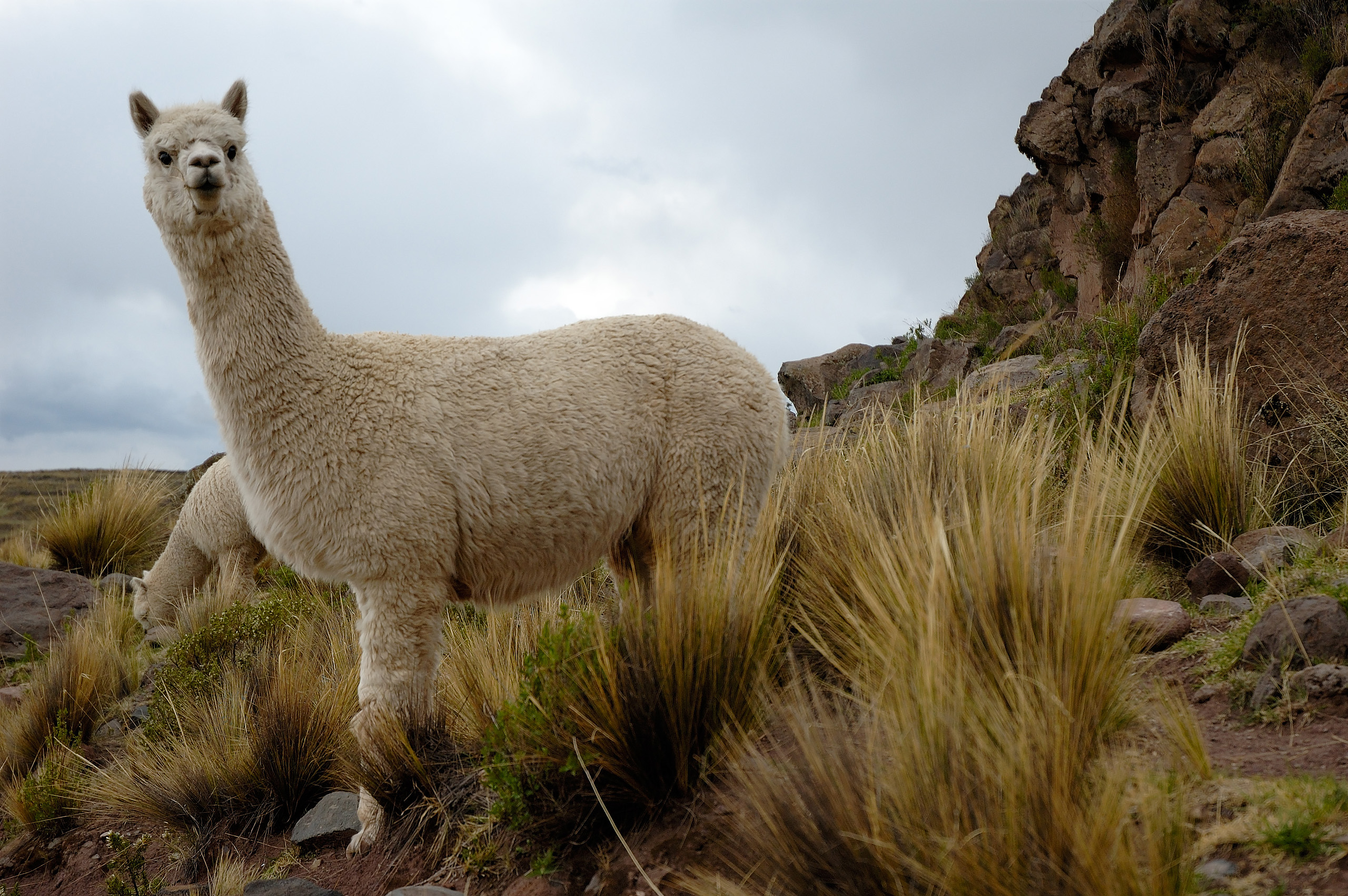
A pair of Huacaya alpacas near an Inca burial site in Peru

The successful manufacture of various alpaca cloths by Salt and other Bradford manufacturers created a great demand for alpaca wool, which could not be met by the native product. Apparently, the number of alpacas available never increased appreciably. Unsuccessful attempts were made to acclimatize alpaca in England, on the European continent, and in Australia, and even to cross English breeds of sheep with alpaca. There is a cross between alpaca and llama—a true hybrid in every sense—producing a material placed upon the Liverpool market under the name "Huarizo". Crosses between the alpaca and vicuña have not proved satisfactory, as the crosses that have produced offspring have a very short fleece, more characteristic of the vicuña, but attempts at better crosses are underway at farms in the US. Alpacas are now being bred in the US, Canada, Australia, New Zealand, UK, Germany and numerous other places.

Alpaca ranching has a reasonably low impact on the environment. Individual U.S. farms are producing finished alpaca products like hats, mitts, scarves, socks, insoles, footwarmers, sweaters, and jackets. Alpaca fiber's light weight and warmth offers comfort in cold weather. Using a blend of alpaca and sheep's wool such as merino is common to the alpaca fiber industry to reduce price, but no additional textile need be added to alpaca to improve processing or the qualities of the final, durable product.

In December 2006, the General Assembly of the United Nations proclaimed 2009 to be the International Year of Natural Fibres.

== Structure ==
Alpaca fiber is similar in structure to sheep's wool fiber. The fiber softness comes from having a different, smoother scale surface than sheep wool. American breeders have enhanced the softness by selecting for finer (smaller-diameter) fiber, similar to merino wool. Fiber diameter is a highly inherited trait in both alpaca and sheep. The difference in the individual fiber scales compared to sheep wool also creates the glossy shine which is prized in alpaca. Alpaca fibers have a higher tensile strength than wool fibers. In processing, slivers lack fiber cohesion and single alpaca rovings lack strength, but a blend of each can increase durability several times over at a cost of more twisting, especially in Suri, and this can reduce a yarn's softness.

The alpaca has a very fine and light fleece. It does not retain water, is a thermal insulator even when wet, and can resist solar radiation effectively. These characteristics guarantee the animals a permanent and appropriate coat to protect against extreme changes of temperature. This fiber offers the same protection to humans.

=== Medullation ===
Medullated fibers are those with a central core, which may be continuous, interrupted, or fragmented. Here, the cortical cells that make up the walls of the fiber are wrapped around a medulla, or core, that is made up of another type of cell (called medullary cells). Later, these cells may contract or disappear, forming air pockets which assist insulation.

Medullation can be an objectionable trait. Medullated fibers can take less dye, standing out in the finished garment, and are weaker. The proportion of medullated fibers is higher in the coarser, unwanted guard hairs: there is less or no medullation in the finer, lower micrometer fibers. These undesirable fibers are easy to see and give a garment a hairy appearance. Quality alpaca products should be free from these medullated fibers.

== Quality ==
Good-quality alpaca fiber is approximately 18 to 25 μm in diameter. While breeders report fiber can sell for US$2 to $4 per ounce, the world wholesale price for processed, spun alpaca "tops" is only between about $10 to $24/kg (according to quality), i.e. about $0.28 to $0.68 per oz. Finer fleeces are preferred and thus more expensive. As an alpaca gets older, its fibers thicken, between 1 μm and 5 μm per year. This is sometimes caused by overfeeding, as excess nutrients are converted to (thicker) fiber rather than to fat.

Elite alpaca breeders in the United States are attempting to breed animals with fleece that does not degrade in quality as the animals age. They are looking for lingering fineness (fiber diameters remaining under 20 μm) for aging animals. It is believed this lingering fineness is heritable and thus can be improved over time.

As with all fleece-producing animals, quality varies from animal to animal, and some alpacas produce fiber which is less than ideal. Fiber and conformation are the two most important factors in determining an alpaca's value.

Alpacas come in 22 natural colors, with more than 300 shades from a true black through brown-blacks, browns, fawns, white, silver-greys, and rose-greys, and more. However, white is predominant, because of selective breeding: the white fiber can be dyed in the largest ranges of colors. In South America, the preference is for white, as they generally have better fleece than the darker-colored animals. A demand for darker fiber in the United States and elsewhere has led to the colors' reintroduction, but the quality of the darker fiber has decreased slightly, although breeders have made progress in breeding dark animals with exceptional fiber.

== Dyeing ==
Before dyeing, the alpaca fiber must go through other stages:

1. Selection of wool, according to color, size and quality of fiber
2. "Escarminado", removal of grass, dirt, thorns, and other impurities
3. Washing, to remove dirt - alpaca contains no grease or lanolin found in wool which requires harsh chemical scouring.
4. Spinning

Once the fiber is clean, it is possible to begin the process of dyeing. Alpaca fiber can be dyed with both synthetic and natural dyes.

== Uses ==
Alpaca fiber is used for many purposes, including making clothing such as bedding, hats, mitts, socks, scarves, gloves, and jumpers. Rugs and toys can also be made from alpaca fiber. Sweaters are most common.

== See also ==
- International Year of Natural Fibres
