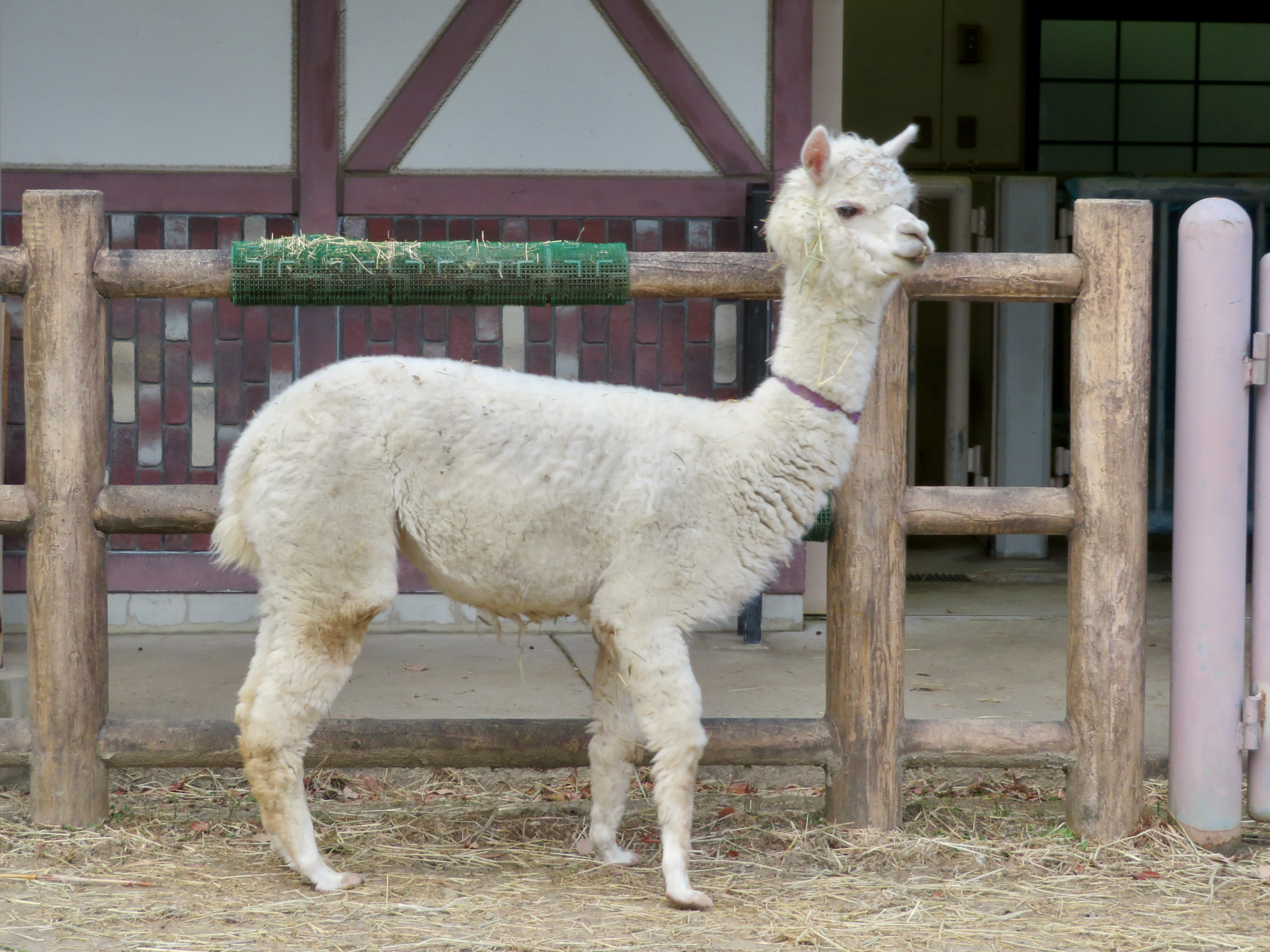
- An Alpaca kept at Higashiyama Zoo and Botanical Gardens, Japan

Conservation status
- Domesticated

Scientific classification
- Kingdom: Animalia
- Phylum: Chordata
- Class: Mammalia
- Order: Artiodactyla
- Family: Camelidae
- Genus: Lama
- Species: L. pacos

Binomial name
- Lama pacos (Linnaeus, 1758)
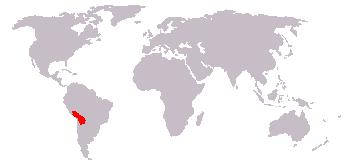
- Alpaca range

Synonyms
- Camelus pacos Linnaeus, 1758; Vicugna pacos (Linnaeus, 1758)

= Alpaca =

Domesticated species of South American camelid

The alpaca (Lama pacos) is a domesticated species of South American camelid. Traditionally, alpacas were kept in herds that grazed on the level heights of the Andes of Southern Peru, Western Bolivia, Ecuador, and Northern Chile. Today, alpacas are found on farms and ranches worldwide, with thousands of animals born and raised annually. Alpacas are especially popular in North America, Europe, and Australia.

There are two modern breeds of alpaca, separated based on their respective region of endemism and fiber (wool) type: the Suri alpaca and the Huacaya alpaca. Both breeds produce a highly valued fiber, with Suri alpacas' fiber growing in straight "locks," while Huacaya fiber has a "crimped," wavy texture and grows in bundles. These breeds' fibers are used for making knitted and woven items, similar to sheep's wool.

Alpacas are visually and genetically similar to, and often confused with a relative species, the llama; however, alpacas are visibly shorter and predominantly bred for their wool, while llamas have long been more highly prized as livestock guardians (in place of dogs), and as a pack animal (beast-of-burden), owing to their nimble mountain-climbing abilities. Both the alpaca and the llama are believed to have been domesticated and selectively bred from their wild counterparts — the smaller, fine-haired vicuña and the larger, stronger guanaco, respectively — at least 5,000 to 6,000 years ago. Nonetheless, all four South American camelids are closely related and can successfully crossbreed.

Alpacas communicate through body language, spitting to show dominance when distressed, fearful, or agitated. Male alpacas are more aggressive than females. In some cases, alpha males will immobilize the head and neck of a weaker or challenging male to show their strength and dominance.

In the textile industry, "alpaca" primarily refers to the hair of Peruvian alpacas. More broadly, it refers to a style of fabric originally made from alpaca hair, such as mohair, Icelandic sheep wool, or even high-quality wool from other breeds of sheep. In trade, distinctions are made between alpacas and the several styles of mohair and luster.

== Background ==
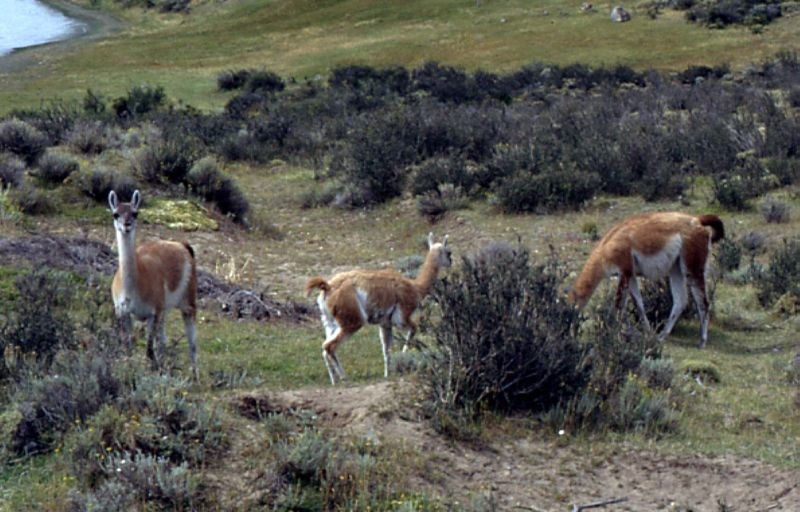
Guanacos (wild parent species of llamas) near Torres del Paine, Chile

The relationship between alpacas and vicuñas was disputed for many years. In the 18th and 19th centuries, the four South American lamoid species were assigned scientific names. At that time, the alpaca was assumed to be descended from the llama, ignoring similarities in size, fleece, and dentition between the alpaca and the vicuña. Classification was complicated by the fact that all four species of South American camelid can interbreed and produce fertile offspring. The advent of DNA technology made a more accurate classification possible.

In 2001, the alpaca genus classification changed from Lama pacos to Vicugna pacos, following the presentation of a paper on work by Miranda Kadwell et al. on alpaca DNA to the Royal Society showing the alpaca is descended from the vicuña, not the guanaco.

An adult alpaca generally is between 81 and 99 centimetres (32 and 39 inches) in height at the shoulders (withers). They usually weigh between 48 and 90 kilograms (106 and 198 pounds). Raised in the same conditions, the difference in weight can be small with males weighing around 22.3 kilograms (49 lb 3 oz) and females 21.3 kilograms (46 lb 15 oz).

=== Origin and domestication ===
Alpacas were domesticated thousands of years ago. The Moche people of Northern Peru often used alpaca images in their art. Traditionally, alpaca were bred and raised in herds, grazing on the level meadows and escarpments of the Andes, from Ecuador and Peru to Western Bolivia and Northern Chile, typically at an altitude of 3,500 to 5,000 metres (11,000 to 16,000 feet) above sea level. There are no known wild alpacas, and its closest living relative, the vicuña (also native to South America), is the wild ancestor of the alpaca.

The family Camelidae first appeared in the Americas 40–45 million years ago, during the Eocene period, from the common ancestor, Protylopus. The descendants divided into Camelini and Lamini tribes, taking different migratory patterns to Asia and South America, respectively. Although the camelids became extinct in North America around 3 million years ago, they flourished in the South. It was not until 2–5 million years ago, during the Pliocene, that the genus Hemiauchenia of the tribe Lamini split into Palaeolama and Lama; the latter would then split again into Lama and Vicugna upon migrating down to South America.

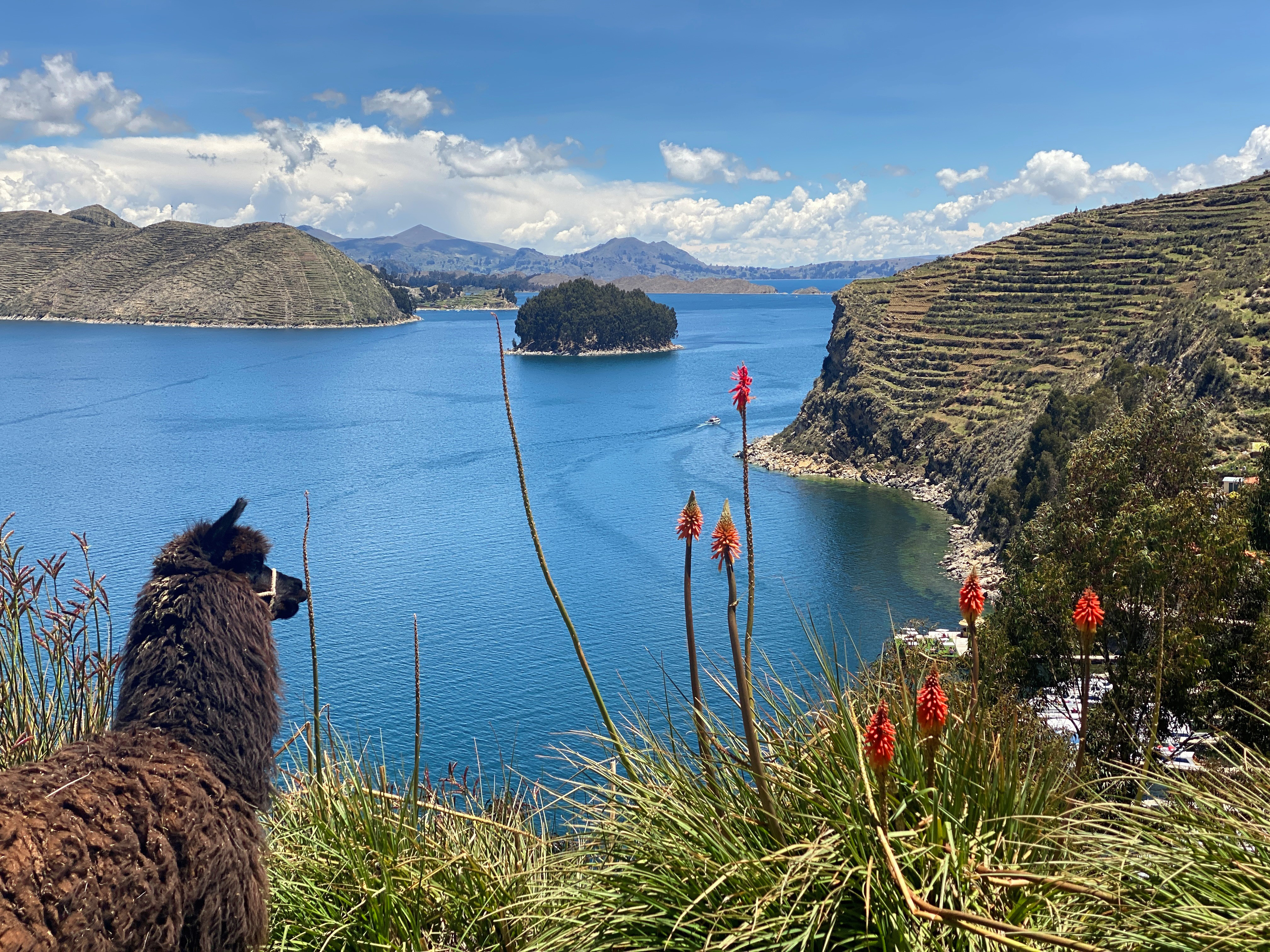
A domesticated alpaca near the shore of Lake Titicaca on the Bolivian side

Remains of vicuña and guanaco dating around 12,000 years have been found throughout Peru. Their domesticated counterparts, the llama and alpaca, have been found mummified in the Moquegua valley, in the South of Peru, dating back 900 to 1000 years. Mummies found in this region show two breeds of alpacas. More precise analysis of bone and teeth of these mummies has demonstrated that alpacas were domesticated from the Vicugna vicugna. Other research, considering the behavioral and morphological characteristics of alpacas and their wild counterparts, seems to indicate that alpacas could find their origins in Lama guanicoe as well as Vicugna vicugna, or even a hybrid of both.

Genetic analysis shows a different picture of the origins of the alpaca. Analysis of mitochondrial DNA shows that most alpacas have guanaco mtDNA, and many also have vicuña mtDNA. But microsatellite data shows that alpaca DNA is much more similar to vicuña DNA than to guanaco DNA. This suggests that alpacas are descendants of the Vicugna vicugna, not of the Lama guanicoe. The discrepancy with mtDNA seems to be because mtDNA is only transmitted by the mother, and recent husbandry practices have caused hybridization between llamas (which primarily carry guanaco DNA) and alpacas. To the extent that many domestic alpacas are the result of male alpacas bred to female llamas, this would explain the mtDNA consistent with guanacos. This situation has led to attempts to reclassify the alpaca as Vicugna pacos.

== Breeds ==
The alpaca is divided into two breeds, Suri and Huacaya, based on its fibers rather than scientific or European classifications.

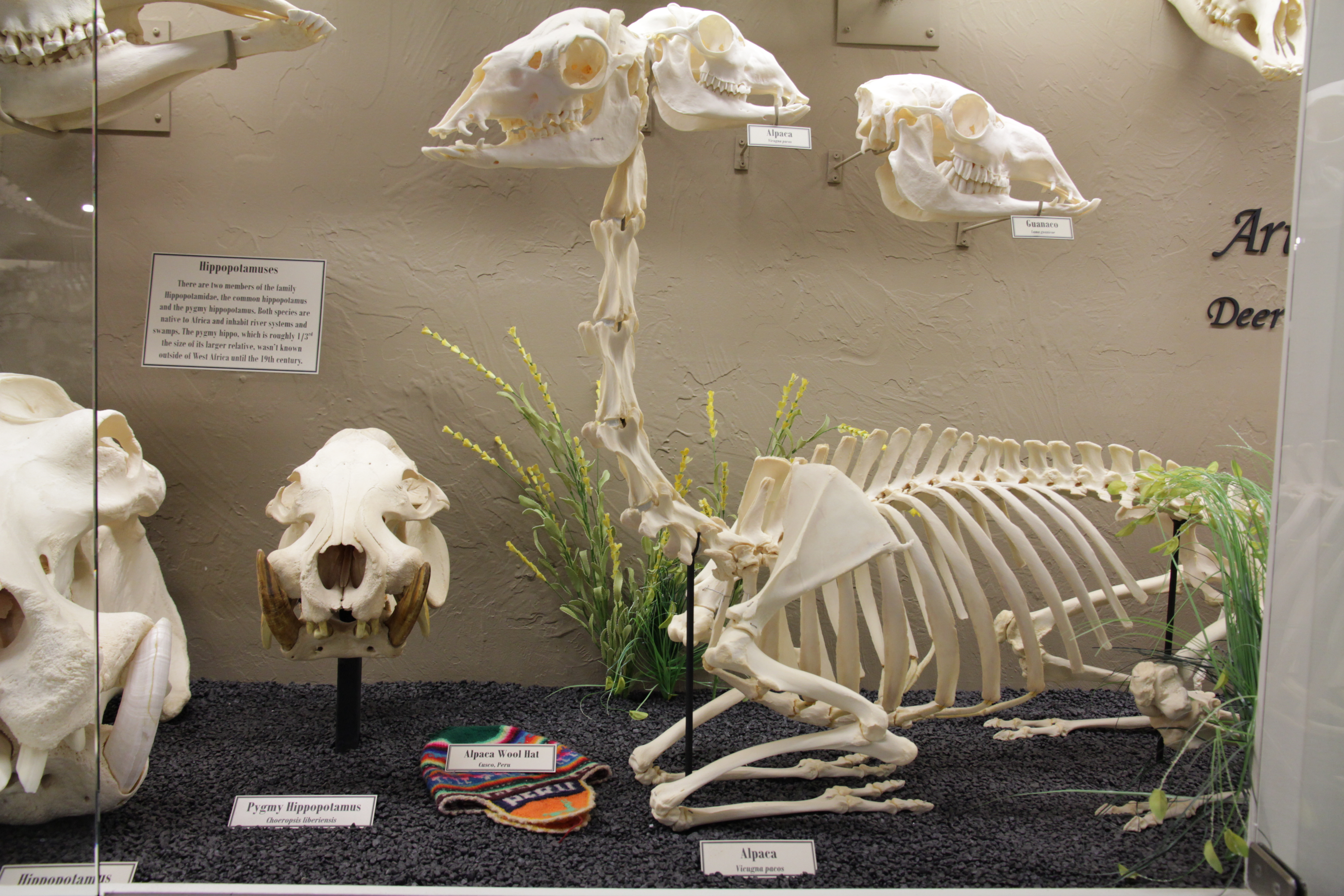
Alpaca skeleton, with alpaca and guanaco skull above (Museum of Osteology)

Huacaya alpacas are the most commonly found, constituting about 90% of the population. The Huacaya alpaca is thought to have originated in post-colonial Peru because of its thicker fleece which makes them more suited to survive in the higher altitudes of the Andes after being pushed into the highlands of Peru with the arrival of the Spanish.

Suri alpacas represent a smaller portion of the total alpaca population, around 10%. They are thought to have been more prevalent in pre-Columbian Peru since they could be kept at a lower altitude where a thicker fleece was not needed for harsh weather conditions.

== Behavior ==
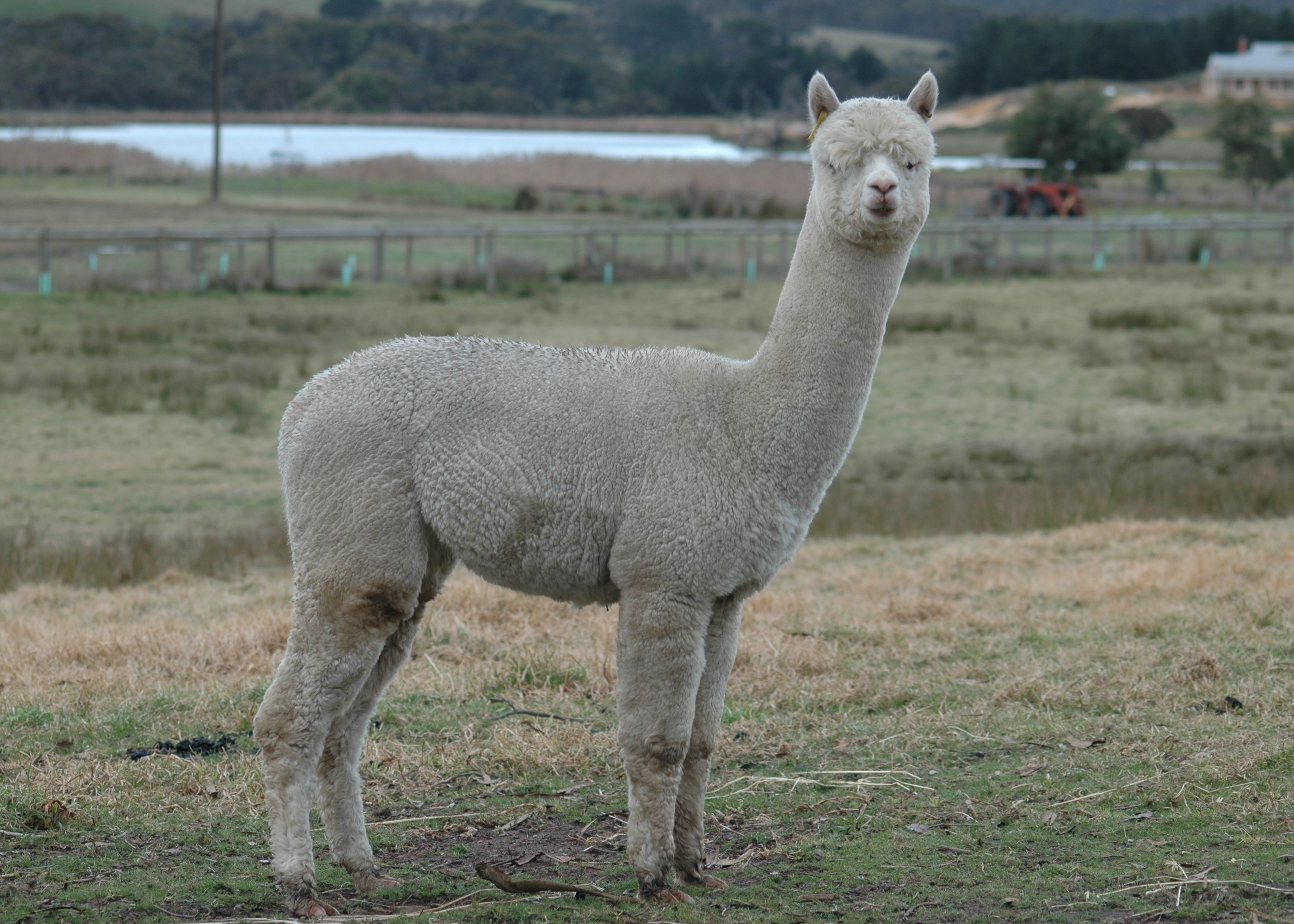
Alpaca near a farm

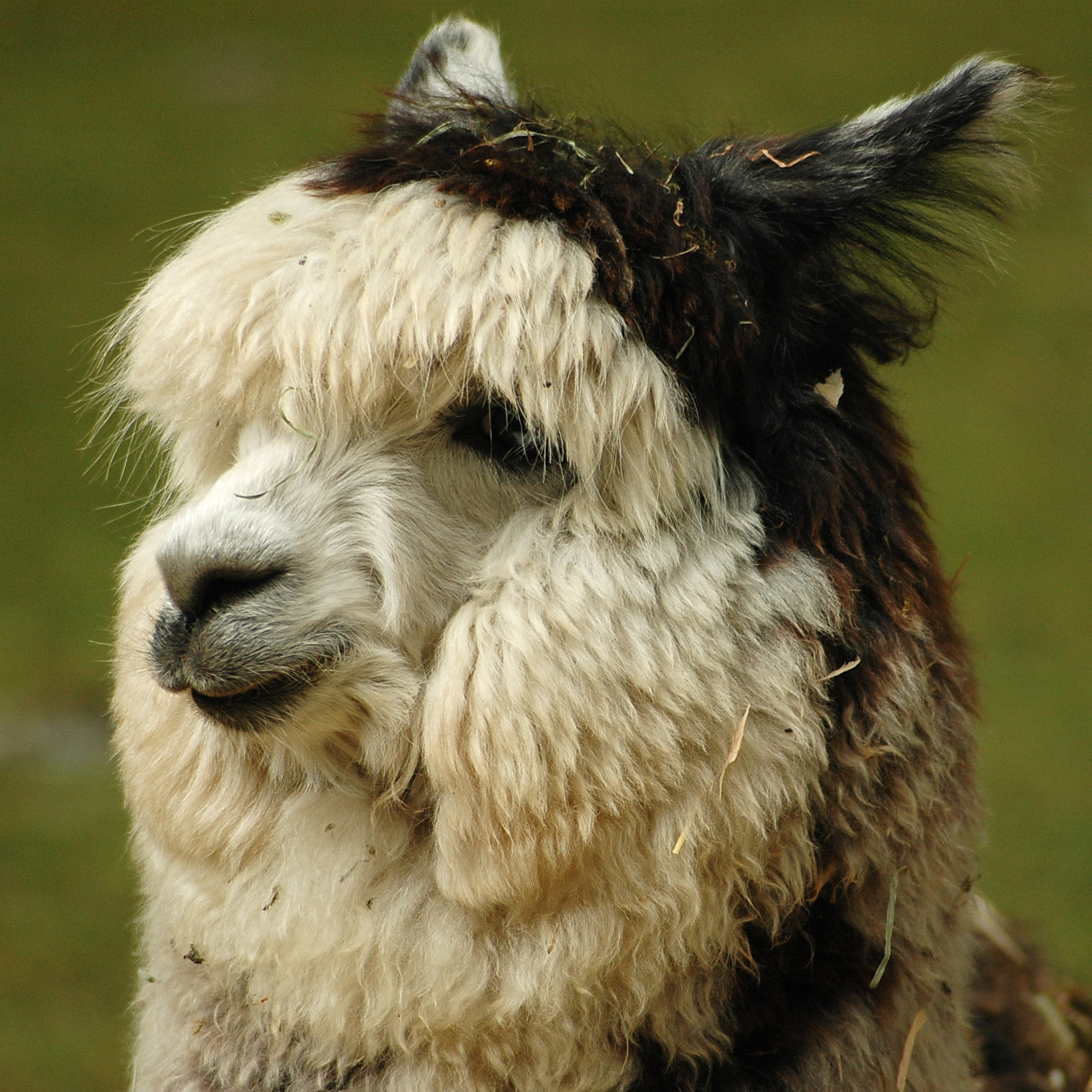
Closeup of an alpaca's face

Alpacas are social herd animals that live in family groups, consisting of a territorial alpha male, females, and their young ones. Alpacas warn the herd about intruders by making sharp, noisy inhalations that sound like a high-pitched bray. The herd may attack smaller predators with their front feet and can spit and kick. Their aggression towards members of the canid family (coyotes, foxes, dogs, etc.) is exploited when alpacas are used as guard llamas for guarding sheep.

Alpacas can sometimes be aggressive, but they can also be very gentle, intelligent, and extremely observant. For the most part, alpacas are very quiet, but male alpacas are more energetic when they get involved in fighting with other alpacas. When they prey, they are cautious and nervous when they feel threatened. They can feel threatened when someone or another alpaca comes up behind them.

Alpacas set their boundaries of "personal space" within their families and groups. They make a hierarchy in some sense, and each alpaca is aware of the dominant animals in each group. Body language is the key to their communication. It helps to maintain their order. One example of their body communication includes a pose named broadside, where their ears are pulled back and they stand sideways. This pose is used when male alpacas are defending their territory. They commonly spit to show dominance when they are in distress, fearful, or feel agitated. Male alpacas are more aggressive than females and tend to establish dominance within their herd group. In some cases, alpha males will immobilize the head and neck of a weaker or challenging male to show their strength and dominance.

When they are young, alpacas tend to follow larger objects and sit near or under them. An example of this is a baby alpaca with its mother. This can also apply when an alpaca passes by an older alpaca.

=== Training ===
Alpacas are generally very trainable and usually respond to rewards, most commonly food. They can usually be petted without getting agitated, especially if one avoids petting the head or neck. Alpacas are usually quite easy to herd, even in large groups. However, during herding, it is recommended for the handler to approach the animals slowly and quietly, as failing to do so can result in danger for both the animals and the handler.

Alpacas and llamas have started showing up in U.S. nursing homes and hospitals as trained, certified therapy animals. The Mayo Clinic says animal-assisted therapy can reduce pain, depression, anxiety, and fatigue. This type of animal therapy is growing in popularity, and several organizations throughout the United States participate.

=== Spitting ===
Not all alpacas spit, but all are capable of doing so. "Spit" is somewhat euphemistic; occasionally, the projectile contains only air and a little saliva, although alpacas commonly bring up acidic stomach contents (generally a green, grassy mix) and project it onto their chosen targets. Spitting is mostly reserved for other alpacas, but an alpaca will also occasionally spit at a human.

Spitting can result in what is called a "sour mouth." A sour mouth is characterized by "a loose-hanging lower lip and a gaping mouth."

Alpacas can spit for several reasons. A female alpaca spits when she is not interested in a male alpaca, typically when she thinks that she is already impregnated. Both sexes of alpaca keep each other away from their food or anything they have their eyes on. Most give a slight warning before spitting by blowing air out and raising their heads, giving their ears a "pinned" appearance.

Alpacas can spit up to ten feet if they need to. For example, if another animal does not back off, the alpaca will throw up its stomach contents, resulting in a lot of spit.

Some signs of stress that can lead to their spitting habits include humming, a wrinkle under their eye, drooling, rapid breathing, and stomping their feet. When alpacas show any sign of interest or alertness, they tend to sniff their surroundings, watch closely, or stand quietly in place and stare.

When it comes to reproduction, they spit because it is a response triggered by the increased progesterone levels, which is associated with ovulation.

=== Hygiene ===
Alpacas use a communal dung pile, where they do not graze. This behavior may limit the spread of internal parasites. Generally, males have much tidier and fewer dung piles than females, which tend to stand in a line and all go simultaneously. One female approaches the dung pile and begins to urinate and/or defecate, and the rest of the herd often follows. Alpaca waste is collected and can be used as soil fertilizer.

Because they prefer using a dung pile for excreting bodily waste, some alpacas have been successfully house-trained.

=== Sounds ===
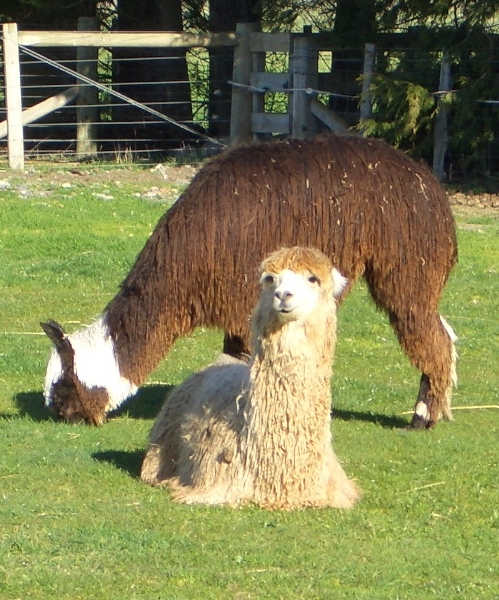
Suri alpacas

Alpacas make a variety of sounds:

- Humming: When alpacas are born, the mother and baby hum constantly. They also hum as a sign of distress, especially when they are separated from their herd. Alpacas may also hum when curious, happy, worried, or cautious.
- Snorting: Alpacas snort when another alpaca is invading their space.
- Grumbling: Alpacas grumble to warn each other. For example, when one is invading another's personal space, it sounds like gurgling.
- Clucking: Similar to a hen's cluck, alpacas cluck when a mother is concerned for her cria. Male alpacas cluck to signal friendly behavior.
- Screaming: Their screams are extremely deafening and loud. They will scream when they are not handled correctly or when a potential enemy is attacking them.
- Screeching: A bird-like cry, presumably intended to terrify the opponent. This sound is typically used by male alpacas when they are in a fight over dominance. When a female screeches, it is more of a growl when she is angry.

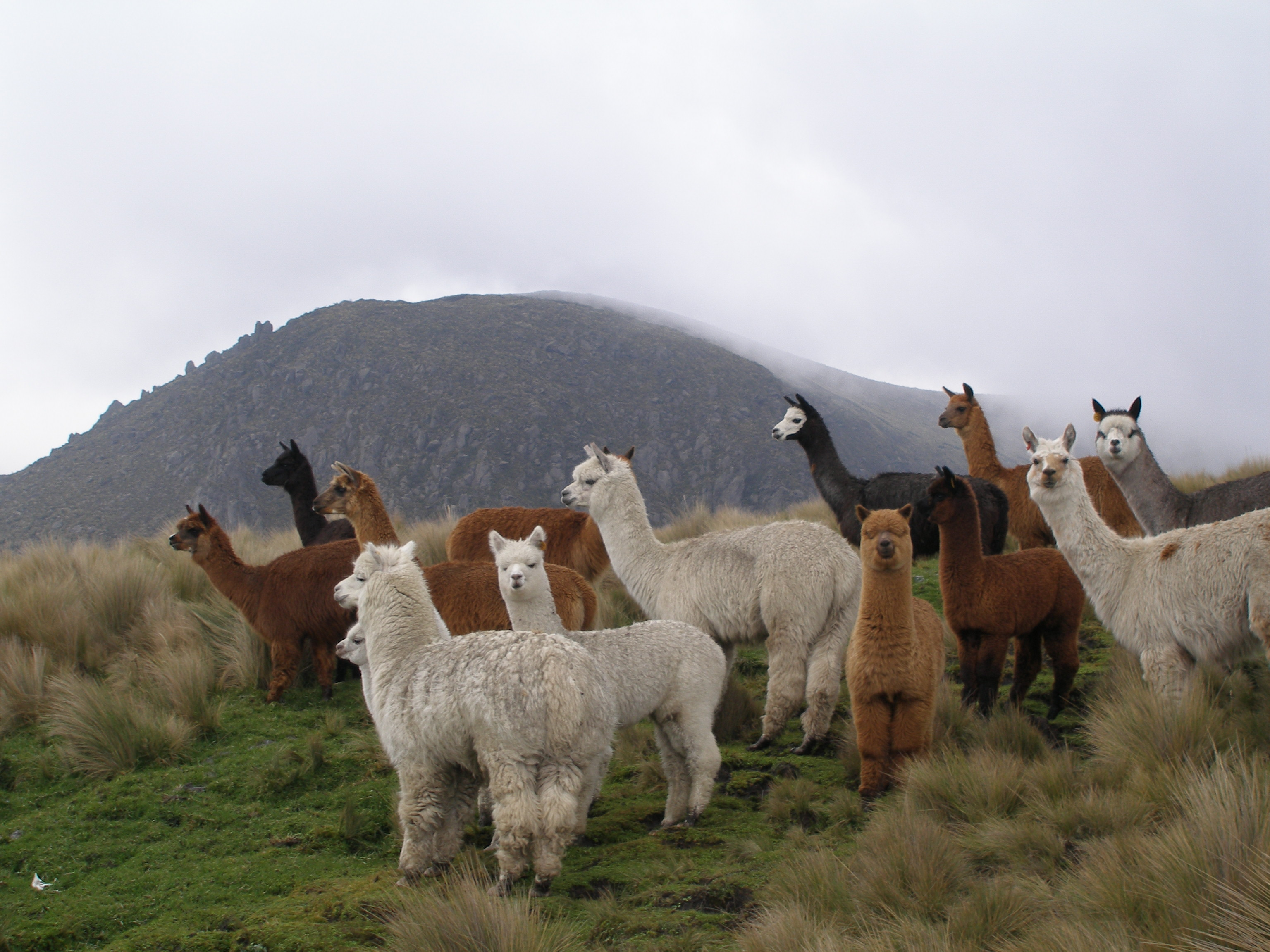
A herd of alpacas near a mountain in Ecuador

=== Reproduction ===
Females are induced ovulators; meaning that the act of mating and the presence of semen causes them to ovulate. Females usually conceive after just one breeding but occasionally do have trouble conceiving. Artificial insemination is technically difficult, expensive, and uncommon but feasible. On the contrary, embryo transfer is more widespread.

A male is usually ready to mate for the first time between two and three years of age. It is not advisable to allow a young female to be bred until she is mature and has reached two-thirds of her mature weight. Overbreeding a young female before conception is possibly a common cause of uterine infections. As the age of maturation varies greatly between individuals, it is usually recommended that novice breeders wait until females are 18 months of age or older before initiating breeding.

Alpacas can breed at any time throughout the year, but it is more difficult to breed in the winter. Most breed during autumn or late spring. The most popular way to have alpacas mate is pen mating, which involves moving both the female and the desired male into a pen. Another way is paddock mating, where one male alpaca is let loose in the paddock with several female alpacas.

The gestation period is, on average, 11.5 months, and usually results in a single offspring, or cria. Twins are rare, occurring about once per 1,000 deliveries. Cria are generally between 15 and 19 pounds, and are standing 30 to 90 minutes after birth. Two weeks after a female gives birth, she is generally receptive to breeding again. Crias may be weaned through human intervention at about six months old and 60 pounds weight. However, many breeders prefer to allow the female to decide when to wean her offspring; they can be weaned earlier or later depending on their size and emotional maturity.

The average lifespan of an alpaca is between 15 and 20 years, and the longest-lived alpaca on record is 28 years.

== Pests and diseases ==
Cattle tuberculosis can also infect alpacas: Mycobacterium bovis also causes TB in this species worldwide. Krajewska-Wędzina et al., 2020 detect M. bovis in individuals traded from the United Kingdom to Poland. To accomplish this they develop a seroassay which correctly identifies positive subjects which are false negative for a common skin test. Krajewska-Wędzina et al. also find that alpacas are unusual in mounting a competent early-infection immune response. Bernitz et al., 2021 believe this to generalise to all camelids.

== Habitat and lifestyle ==
Alpacas can be found throughout most of South America. They typically live in temperate conditions in the mountains with high altitudes.

They are easy to care for since they are not limited to a specific type of environment. Animals such as flamingos, condors, spectacled bears, mountain lions, coyotes, llamas, and sheep live near alpacas when they are in their natural habitat.

== Population ==
Alpacas are native to Peru but can be found throughout the globe in captivity. Peru currently has the largest alpaca population, with over half the world's animals. The population declined drastically after the Spanish Conquistadors invaded the Andes mountains in 1532, after which 98% of the animals were destroyed. The Spanish also brought with them diseases that were fatal to alpacas.

European conquest forced the animals to move higher into the mountains, which remained there permanently. Although alpacas had almost been wiped out completely, they were rediscovered sometime during the 19th century by Europeans. After finding their uses, animals became important to societies during the Industrial Revolution.

== Diet ==
(video) An alpaca chewing

Alpacas chew their food which ends up being mixed with their cud and saliva and then they swallow it. Alpacas usually eat 1.5% of their body weight daily for normal growth. They mainly need pasture grass, hay, or silage. Still, some may also need supplemental energy and protein foods, and they will also usually try to chew on almost anything (e.g., empty bottles). Most alpaca ranchers rotate their feeding grounds so the grass can regrow, and fecal parasites may die before reusing the area. Pasture grass is a great source of protein. When seasons change, the grass loses or gains more protein. For example, in the spring, the pasture grass has about 20% protein, while it only has 6% in the summer. They need more energy supplements in the winter to produce body heat and warmth. They get their fiber from hay or long stems, which provides them with vitamin E. Green grass contains vitamins A and E.

Alpacas can eat natural unfertilized grass; however, ranchers can also supplement grass with low-protein grass hay. To provide selenium and other necessary vitamins, ranchers will feed their domestic alpacas a daily dose of grain to provide additional nutrients that are not fully obtained from their primary diet. Alpacas may obtain the necessary vitamins in their native grazing ranges.

=== Digestion ===
Like other camelids, alpacas have a three-chambered stomach; combined with chewing cud, this three-chambered system allows maximum extraction of nutrients from low-quality forages. Alpacas are not ruminants, pseudo-ruminants, or modified ruminants, as there are many differences between the anatomy and physiology of a camelid and a ruminant stomach.

Alpacas chew their food in a figure eight motion, swallow it, and then pass it into one of their stomach's chambers. The first and second chambers (C1 and C2) are anaerobic fermentation chambers where the fermentation process begins. The alpaca will further absorb nutrients and water in the first part of the third chamber. The end of the third chamber (called C3) is where the stomach secretes acids to digest food and is the likely place where an alpaca will have ulcers if stressed.

=== Poisonous plants ===
Unlike sheep and goats, which are commonly used to clear overgrown patches of land—as they willingly consume many noxious, poisonous botanical species—, many more common plant families are highly poisonous to alpacas, including the Amaryllidaceae (Amaryllis) family, the dogbane-milkweed family Apocynaceae (Asclepias, Hoya, Nerium, Plumeria, etc.), the aroid family Araceae (Anthurium, Colocasia, Monstera, Philodendron, Zantedeschia, etc.), the Asparagaceae (Agave, Asparagus, Dracaena, and more), Asteraceae (daisies and Senecio, etc.), Caryophyllaceae (Dianthus), some Ericaceae (azaleas, heather, etc.), Euphorbiaceae (castor bean, Croton, poinsettia, etc.), Fagaceae (beech and oak; acorns), ferns (especially Pteridium), African rue, Iridaceae (Crocus, Freesia, Gladiolus, Iris, etc.), Melanthiaceae (corn-lilies), Polygonaceae (buckwheat, knotweed), ragweed, Ranunculaceae (buttercups), as well as orange tree and other Citrus foliage, among others.

== Fiber ==
A selection of products made from alpaca fiber

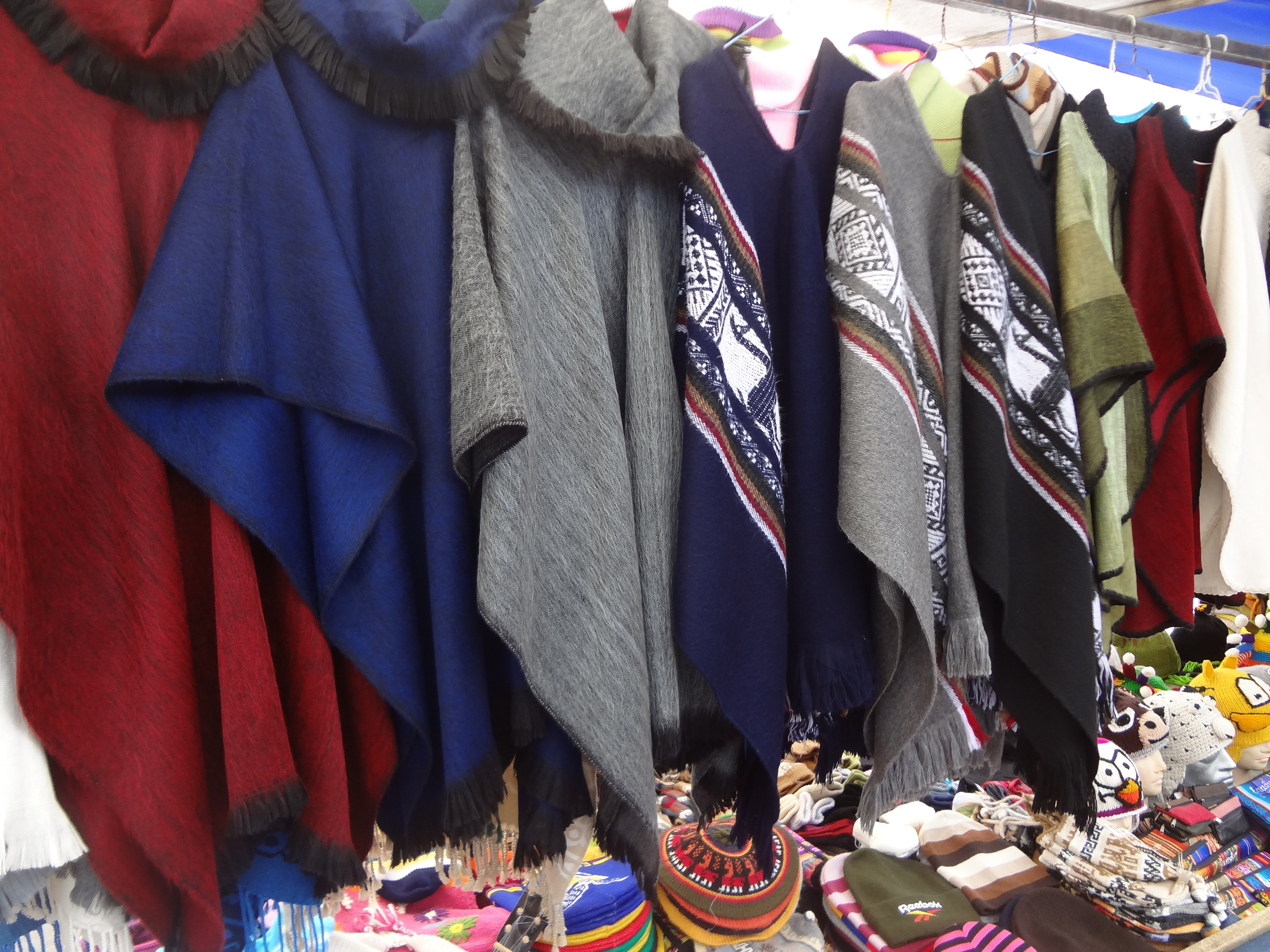
Traditional alpaca clothing at the Otavalo Artisan Market in the Andes of Ecuador

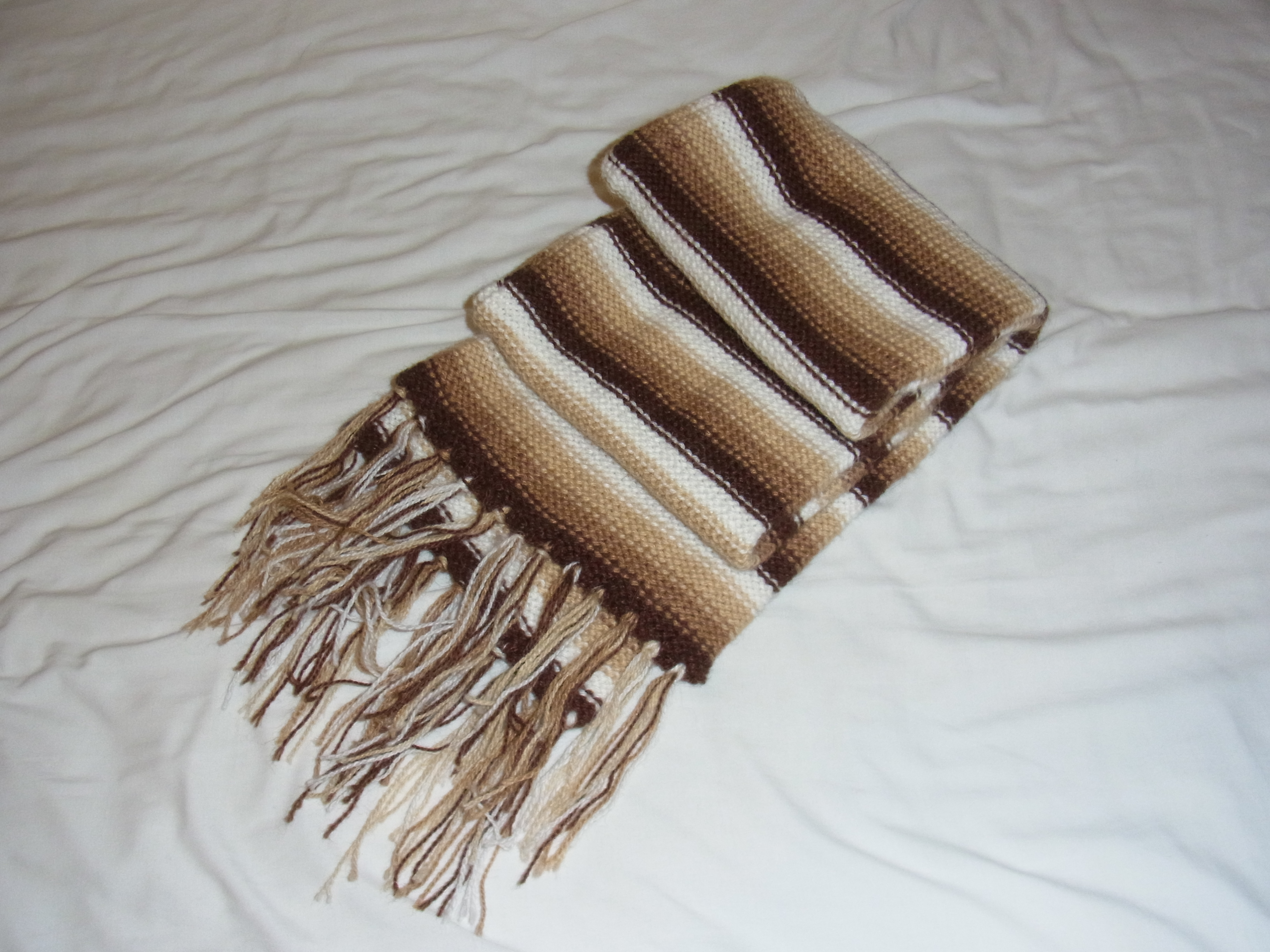
A knitted scarf made from alpaca wool

Alpaca fleece is soft and possesses water and flame resistant properties, making it a valuable commodity. It is used for making knitted and woven items, similar to sheep's wool. These items include blankets, sweaters, hats, gloves, scarves, a wide variety of textiles, and ponchos, in South America, as well as sweaters, socks, coats, and bedding in other parts of the world. The fiber comes in more than 52 natural colors as classified in Peru, 12 as classified in Australia, and 16 as classified in the United States.

Alpacas are typically sheared once per year in the spring. Each shearing produces approximately 2.3 to 4.5 kilograms (5 to 10 pounds) of fiber per alpaca. An adult alpaca might produce 1.4 to 2.6 kilograms (50 to 90 ounces) of first-quality fiber as well as 1.4 to 2.8 kilograms (50 to 100 ounces) of second- and third-quality fiber. The quality of alpaca fiber is determined by how crimpy it is. Typically, the greater the number of small folds in the fiber, the greater the quality.

There are two modern breeds of alpaca, separated based on their respective region of endemism and fiber (wool) type—the Suri alpaca and the Huacaya alpaca. Both breeds produce a fiber that is highly valued, with Suri alpaca fiber growing in straight "locks" and being comparable to the mohair of Turkish Angora goats; Huacaya has a "crimped", wavy texture and grows in bundles more similar to sheep's wool.

== Prices ==
Alpacas were the subject of a speculative bubble between their introduction to North America in 1984 and the early 21st century. The price for American alpacas ranged from US$50 for a castrated male (gelding) to US$675,000 for the highest in the world, depending on breeding history, sex, and color. In 2006, researchers warned that the higher prices sought for alpaca breeding stock were largely speculative and not supported by market fundamentals, given the low inherent returns per head from the main end product, alpaca fiber, and prices into the $100s per head rather than $10,000s would be required for a commercially viable fiber production herd.

Marketed as "the investment you can hug" in television commercials by the Alpaca Owners and Breeders Association, the market for alpacas was almost entirely dependent on breeding and selling animals to new buyers, a classic sign of speculative bubbles in livestock. The bubble burst in 2007, with the price of alpaca breeding stock dropping by thousands of dollars each year thereafter. Many farmers found themselves unable to sell animals for any price, or even give them away.

It is possible to raise up to 25 alpacas per hectare (10/acre), as they have a designated area for waste products and keep their eating area away from their waste area. However, this ratio differs from country to country and is highly dependent on the quality of pasture available (in many desert locations it is generally only possible to run one to three animals per acre due to lack of suitable vegetation). Fiber quality is the primary variant in the price achieved for alpaca wool; in Australia, it is common to classify the fiber by the thickness of the individual hairs and by the amount of vegetable matter contained in the supplied shearings.

== Livestock ==
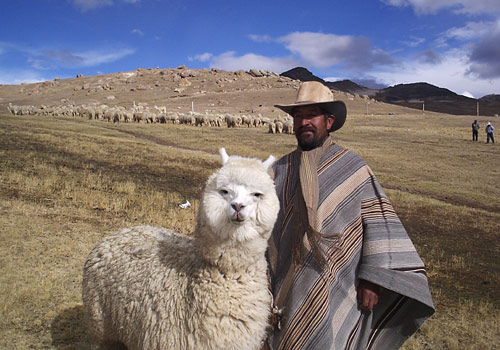
A Bolivian man and his alpaca

Alpacas need to eat 1–2% of their body weight per day, which is about two 27 kg (60 lb) bales of grass hay per month per animal. When formulating a proper diet for alpacas, water and hay analysis should be performed to determine the proper vitamin and mineral supplementation program. Two options are to provide free choice salt/mineral powder or feed a specially formulated ration. Indigenous to the highest regions of the Andes, this harsh environment has created an extremely hardy animal, so only minimal housing and predator fencing are needed. The alpacas' three-chambered stomachs allow for extremely efficient digestion. There are no viable seeds in the manure, because alpacas prefer to only eat tender plant leaves, and will not consume thick plant stems; therefore, alpaca manure does not need composting to enrich pastures or ornamental landscaping. Nail and teeth trimming are needed every six to twelve months, along with annual shearing.

Similar to ruminants, such as cattle and sheep, alpacas have only lower teeth at the front of their mouths; therefore, they do not pull the grass up by the roots. Rotating pastures is still important, though, as alpacas have a tendency to regraze an area repeatedly. Alpacas are fiber-producing animals; they do not need to be slaughtered to reap their product, and their fiber is a renewable resource that grows yearly.

== Cultural presence ==
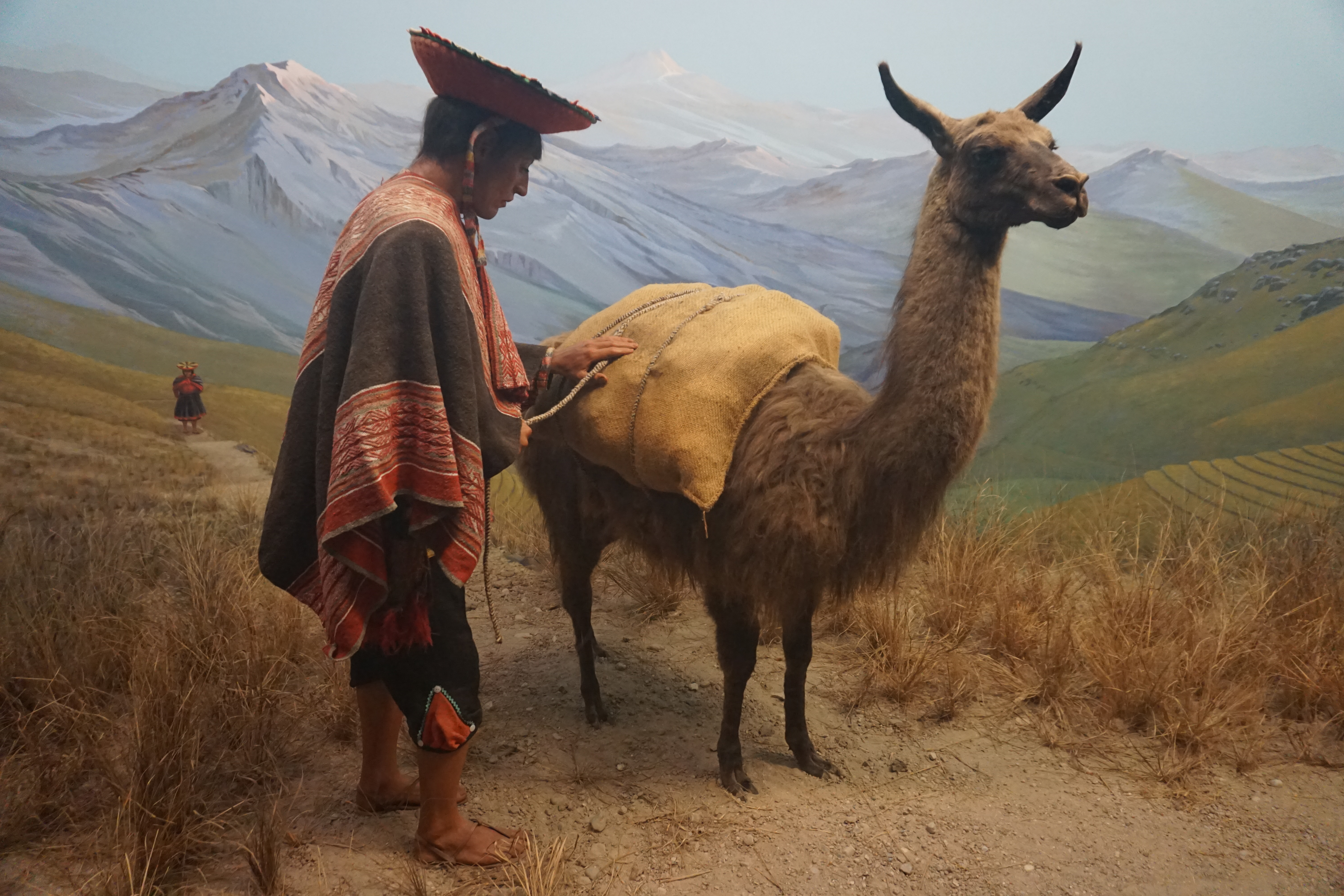
The High Trail in the Andes: Peru diorama at the Milwaukee Public Museum, depicting an Andean man and his llama-transport.

Alpacas are closely tied to cultural practices for Andeans people. Prior to colonization, the image of the alpaca was used in rituals and in their religious practices. Since the people in the region depended heavily on these animals for their sustenance, the alpaca was seen as a gift from Pachamama. Alpacas were used for their meat, fibers for clothing, and art, and their images in the form of conopas.

Conopas take their appearance from the Suri alpacas, with long locks flanking their sides and bangs covering the eyes, and a depression on the back. This depression is used in ritual practices, usually filled with coca leaves and fat from alpacas and lamas, to bring fertility and luck. While their use was prevalent before colonization, the attempts to convert the Andean people to Catholicism led to the acquisition of more than 3,400 conopas in Lima alone.

The origin of alpacas is depicted in legend; the legend states they came to be in the world after a goddess fell in love with a man. The goddess' father only allowed her to be with her lover if he cared for her herd of alpacas. On top of caring for the herd, he was to always carry a small animal for his entire life. As the goddess came into our world, the alpacas followed her. Everything was fine until the man set the small animal down, and the goddess fled back to her home. On her way back home, the man attempted to stop her and her herd from fleeing. While he was not able to stop her from returning, he was able to stop a few alpacas from returning. These alpacas who did not make it back are said to be seen today in the swampy lands in the Andes waiting for the end of the world, so they may return to their goddess.

== See also ==
- Skrjabinema – an intestinal parasite that infects the guanaco
- Grass mud horse – a Chinese Internet meme based on alpacas
