= Suri alpaca =

Breed of alpaca

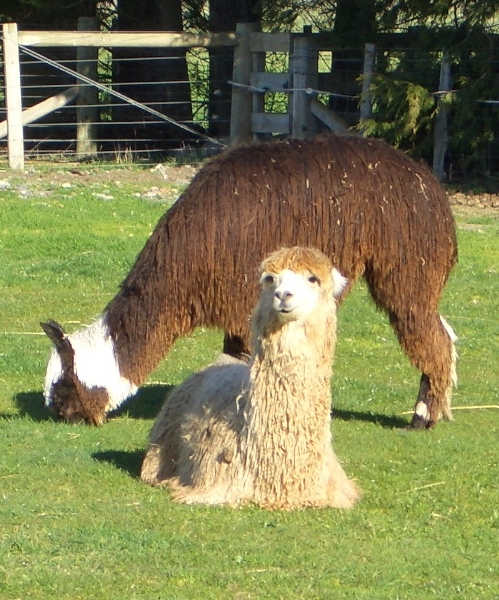
Suri alpacas

Suri alpaca is one of the two breeds of alpaca, the other being the Huacaya. Of 3.7 million alpacas worldwide, less than 10% are thought to be of the Suri breed. One study found that Suri alpacas could be reliably distinguished from Huacayas by looking for a low frequency of hairs less than 35 micrometers in diameter, as well as fewer hairs with more than eight cuticular scales. Suri alpacas may be bred for the lustre of their coats.
