= Mohair =

Natural fiber (hair) of the Angora goat

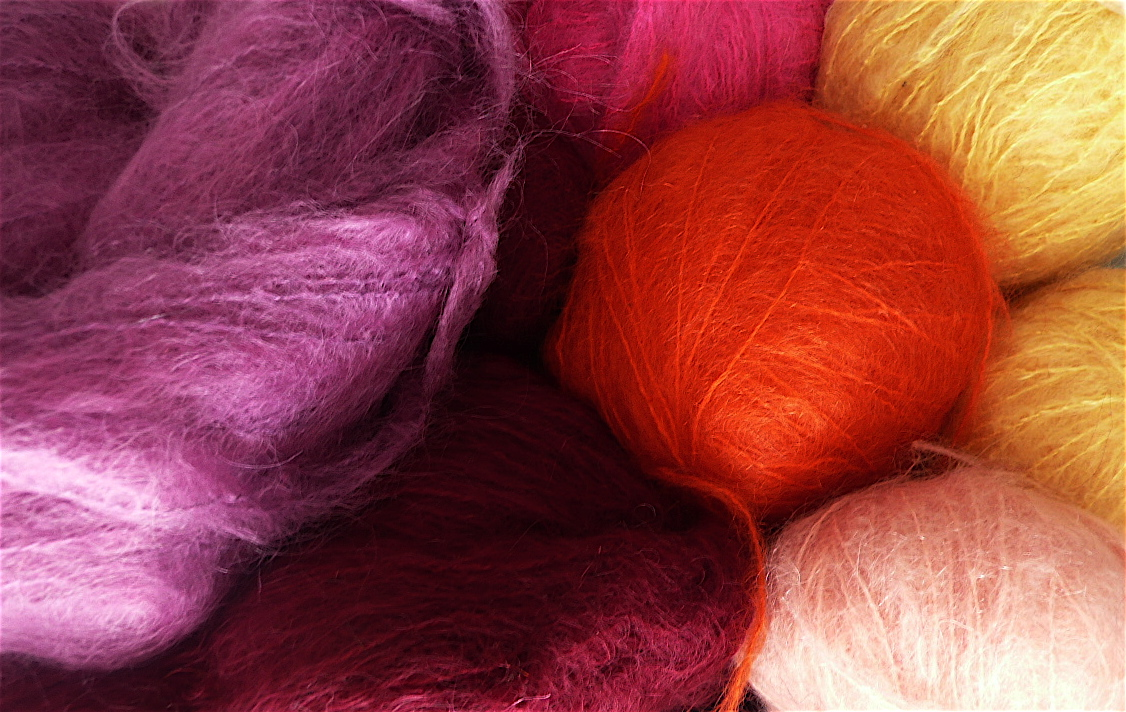
Mohair wool

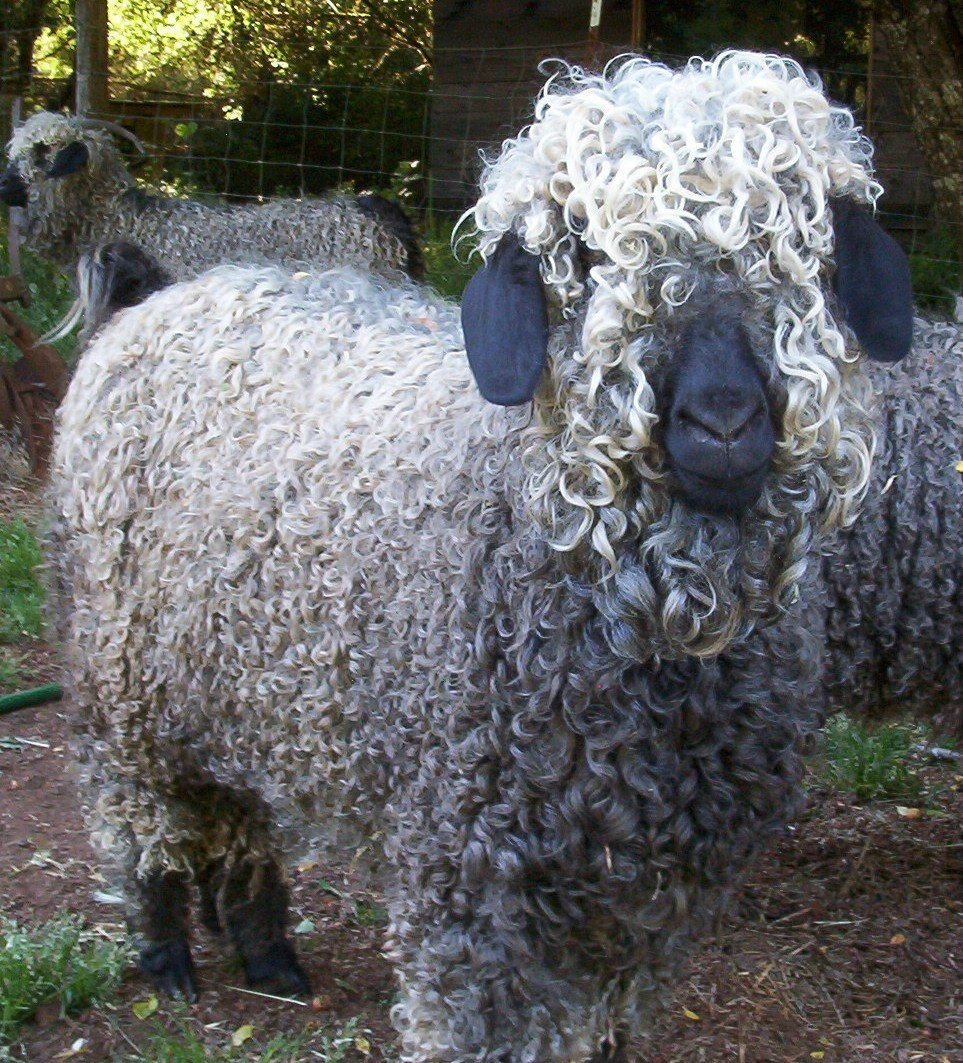
An Angora goat

Mohair (pronounced /ˈmoʊhɛər/) is a fabric or yarn made from the hair of the Angora goat (not Angora wool, which comes from the fur of the Angora rabbit). Both durable and resilient, mohair is lustrous with high sheen, and is often blended to add these qualities to a textile. Mohair takes dye exceptionally well. It feels warm in winter due to excellent insulating properties, while moisture-wicking keeps it cool in summer. It is durable, naturally elastic, flame-resistant and crease-resistant. It is considered a luxury fiber, like cashmere, alpaca, angora, and silk, and is more expensive than most sheep's wool.

Mohair is composed mostly of keratin, a protein in the hair, wool, horns and skin of all mammals, but mohair's special properties are unique to the Angora goat. While it has scales like wool, they are not fully developed; thus, mohair feels different from common or standard wool.

Mohair fiber is approximately 25–45 micrometres in diameter. It expands in diameter with the age of the goat, growing thicker as the animal gets older. Finer, softer hair from younger animals is used (for example) in scarves and shawls; the thicker, coarser hair from older animals is more often used for carpets and in heavy fabrics intended for outerwear.

The term mohair is sometimes used to describe the material in the folding roof on convertible cars. In this case mohair refers to a denim-like canvas.

== Production ==
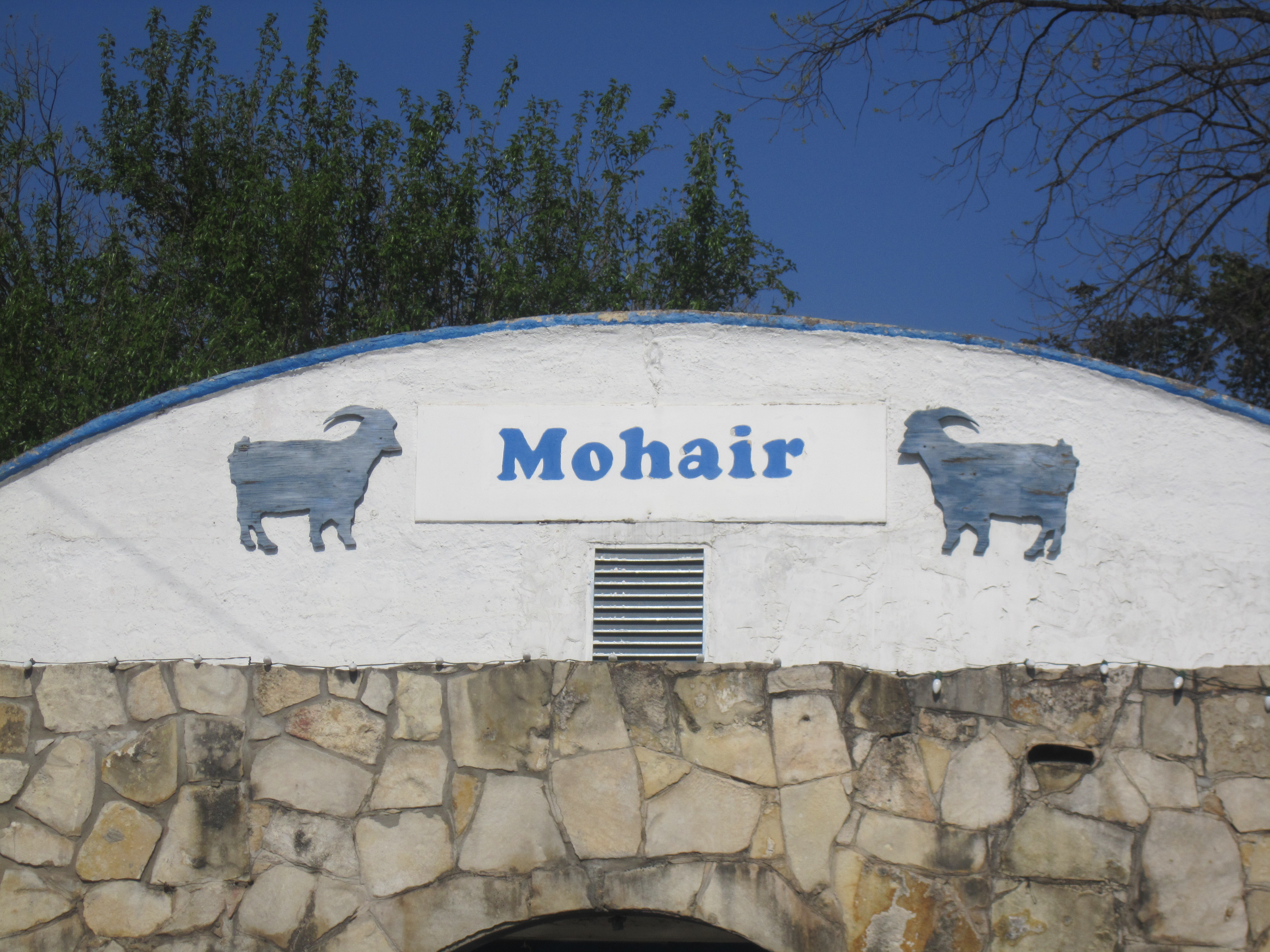
Mohair is vital to the economy of the Texas Hill Country, including the Real County community of Camp Wood.

Angora goats are sheared twice a year, in the spring and in the fall. One goat will produce 5 to 7.5 kilograms (11–17 lb) of mohair a year. Shearing is done on a cleanly-swept floor and extra care is taken to keep the hair clean and free of debris. The hair is then processed to remove natural grease, dirt, and vegetable matter. Mohair grows in uniform locks. The Angora goat is a single-coat breed, and unlike pygora or cashmere, there is no need to dehair a mohair fleece to separate the coarse hair from the down hair.

South Africa is the world's largest mohair producer, supplying about 56% of global production in 2024. Neighbouring Lesotho accounted for about 16% of world production in 2022. Due to animal cruelty in the South African farms, Zara, H&M, Gap, Topshop, Lacoste, and several other clothing retailers will no longer sell mohair clothing.

== History ==
Mohair is one of the oldest textile fibers, and was produced exclusively in Turkey until the middle of the 19th century. Fabric made of mohair was known in England by the early 18th century. The word "mohair" was adopted into English sometime before 1570 from the Arabic مخير (mukhayyar), a type of haircloth, literally "choice".

In about 1820, raw mohair was first exported from Turkey to England, which then became the leading manufacturer of mohair products. The Yorkshire mills spun yarn that was exported to Russia, Germany, Austria, apart from being woven directly in Yorkshire.

Until 1849, the Turkish province of Ankara was the sole producer of Angora goats. Charles V is believed to be the first to bring Angora goats to Europe. Due to the great demand for mohair fiber, throughout the 1800s there was a great deal of crossbreeding between Angora goats and common goats. The growing demand for mohair further resulted in attempts on a commercial scale to introduce the goat into South Africa (where it was crossed with the native goat) in 1838, the United States in 1849, Australia from 1856 to 1875, and later still New Zealand. In 1849, Angora goats made their way to America as a gift from Turkey.

During the 1960s, a blend of mohair and wool suiting fabric known as Tonik or Tonic was developed in England. This had a shiny, color-changing appearance and was popular among rude boys and the mod subculture. Similar suits were worn by mod revivalists, skinheads, and fans of ska punk and two tone music during the early to mid-1980s.

Today, South Africa is the largest mohair producer in the world, with the majority of South African mohair being produced in the Eastern Cape. The United States is the second-largest producer, with the majority of American mohair being produced in Texas. Turkey also produces good-quality mohair. Because the goats are sheared once a year (different from South Africa), Turkey produces the longest mohair of the world.

In December 2006, the General Assembly of the United Nations proclaimed 2009 to be the International Year of Natural Fibres, so as to raise the profile of mohair and other natural fibers.

== Uses ==
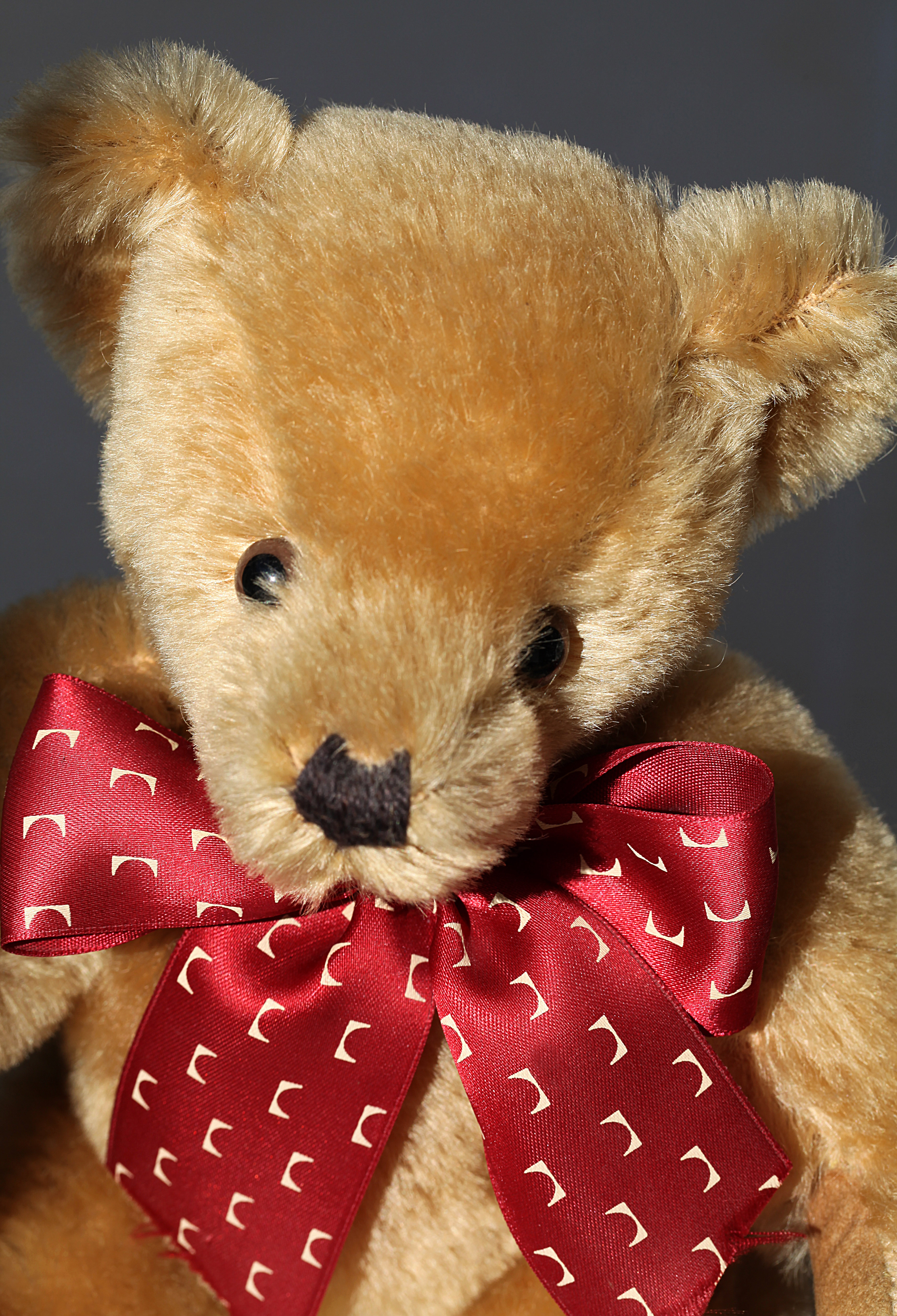
A Merrythought teddy bear made using mohair

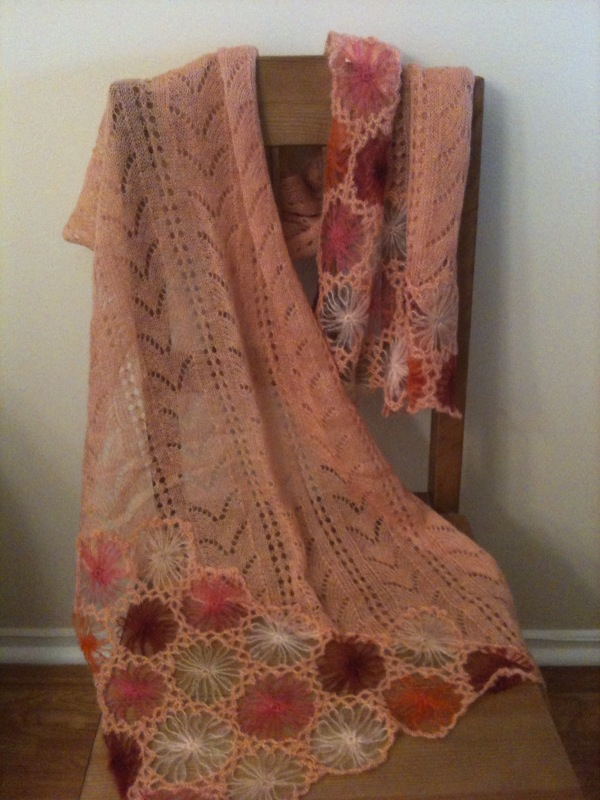
Mohair lace scarf, knitted with crochet trim on the ends

Mohair is used in scarves, winter hats, suits, sweaters, coats, socks and home furnishing. Mohair fiber is also found in carpets, wall fabrics, craft yarns, and many other fabrics, and may be used as a substitute for fur. Because its texture resembles fine human hair, mohair is often used in making high-grade doll wigs or in rooting customized dolls.

Mohair is a very soft yarn when compared with other natural and synthetic fibers. Due to mohair's lacking prominent, protruding scales along the hair's surface, it is often blended with wool or alpaca. Blending the heavily scaled wool helps the smooth mohair fibers hold their shape and stick together when spun into yarn. Mohair is also valued for certain other unique characteristics: it is warmer than other fibers, even when used to make a light-weight garment, and is often blended with wool for this reason; and mohair fibers have a distinctive luster created by the way they reflect light. Combined with mohair's ability to absorb dyes exceptionally well, pure mohair yarns are usually recognizable for their vivid, saturated colours.

Fibers from young goats are softest and are used to manufacture yarn for clothing. Fibers from mature goats are used to produce such things as rugs and carpets. Mohair is also used in 'climbing skins' for randonnée skiing and ski touring. The mohair used in a carpet allows the skier an appropriate ascension method without sliding downhill.

== Mohair industry worldwide ==
The global mohair clip for 2022 was about 4.55 million kilograms (about 4,550 tonnes), of which South Africa produced 51% and Lesotho 16%; together, Southern Africa accounted for about two-thirds of world production. South African mohair is generally exported raw or semi-processed to textile makers in Europe, the UK and the Far East. Prices for adult mohair declined in 2010 while prices for kid mohair remained the same. An emerging market for mohair producers has been China.

== US subsidies for mohair production ==
During World War II, US soldiers wore uniforms made of wool. Worried that domestic producers could not supply enough for future wars, Congress enacted loan and price support programs for wool and mohair in the National Wool Act of 1954 as part of the 1954 Farm Bill. Despite these subsidies, wool and mohair production declined. The strategic importance declined as well; the US military adopted uniforms made of synthetic fibers, such as dacron, and officially removed wool from the list of strategic materials in 1960. Nevertheless, the U.S. government continued to provide subsidies to mohair producers until 1995, when the subsidies were "eliminated effective with the marketing year ending December 31, 1995". In The Future of Freedom: Illiberal Democracy at Home and Abroad, Fareed Zakaria points out that the subsidies were reinstated a few years later, due in large part to the lobbying on behalf of the special interests of the subsidy recipients. By 2000, Congress had appropriated US$20 million for goat and sheep producers. As of 2002, mohair producers were still able to receive special assistance loans from the U.S. government, after an amendment to eliminate the subsidy was defeated. The U.S. currently subsidizes mohair production under the Marketing Assistance Loan Program of the 2014 Farm Act.

== See also ==
- International Year of Natural Fibres
