= International Year of Natural Fibres =

United Nations observance of 2009

The United Nations General Assembly declared 2009 as the International Year of Natural Fibres (IYNF), as well as the International Year of Astronomy.

The proposal for this international year originated in the Food and Agriculture Organization (FAO) at a joint meeting of the Intergovernmental Group on Hard Fibres and the Intergovernmental Group on Jute in 2004, and was endorsed by FAO Conference in 2005. It is one of many international observances declared for specific days, months and years.

The IYNF was intended to cover a wide range of natural fibres, of animal and vegetable origin, and with uses ranging from luxurious apparel to traditional and non-traditional industrial uses.

== Aims ==
The IYNF was expected to raise the profile of such natural fibres. Observance of the Year was based on cooperation among producers of natural fibres to emphasise the positive qualities of natural fibres.

- to raise awareness and stimulate demand for natural fibres;
- to encourage appropriate policy responses from governments to the problems faced by natural fibre industries;
- to foster an effective and enduring international partnership among the various natural fibres industries; and
- to promote the efficiency and sustainability of the natural fibres industries.

== Examples ==
Examples of such fibres are given at the UN website:

=== Plant fibres ===
Plant fibres include seed hairs, such as cotton; stem (or bast) fibres, such as flax and hemp; leaf fibres, such as sisal; and husk fibres, such as coconut.

- Abaca, once a favoured source of rope, abaca shows promise as an energy-saving replacement for glass fibres in automobiles
- Coir, a coarse, short fibre extracted from the outer shell of coconuts, coir is found in ropes, mattresses, brushes, geotextiles and automobile seats
- Cotton, pure cellulose, cotton is the world's most widely used natural fibre and still the undisputed "king" of the global textiles industry
- Flax, one of nature's strongest vegetable fibres, flax was also one of the first to be harvested, spun and woven into textiles
- Hemp, recent advances in the "cottonization" of hemp fibre could open the door to the high quality clothing market
- Jute, the strong threads made from jute fibre are used worldwide in sackcloth - and help sustain the livelihoods of millions of small farmers
- Ramie, white, with a silky lustre, is one of the strongest natural fibres, similar to flax in absorbency and density
- Sisal, too coarse for clothing, is replacing glass fibres in composite materials used to make cars and furniture

=== Animal fibres ===
Animal fibres include wool, hair and secretions, such as silk.

- Alpaca wool, is used to make high-end luxury fabrics, with world production estimated at 5 000 tonnes a year
- Angora wool, the silky white wool of the Angora rabbit is very fine and soft, and used in high quality knitwear
- Camel hair, the best fibre is found on the Bactrian camels of Mongolia and Inner Mongolia, and baby camel hair is the finest and softest
- Cashmere wool, is exceptionally soft to the touch owing to the structure of its fibres and has great insulation properties without being bulky
- Mohair, white, very fine and silky, mohair is noted for its softness, brightness and receptiveness to rich dyes
- Silk, developed in ancient China, where its use was reserved for royalty, silk remains the "queen of fabrics"
- Wool, limited supply and exceptional characteristics have made wool the world's premier textile fibre
