= Huacaya alpaca =

Breed of alpaca

The Huacaya alpaca is a breed of alpaca (Lama pacos) that has a unique appearance and fiber quality. This breed is the most popular alpaca breed with population numbers reaching 2.8 million in Peru alone. They share biological components with other species in the Camelidae family. Their digestive tract, nutrition requirements, and herd behavior mirror that of all camelids. They also survive amidst similar predation, poison, and disease threats that endanger all camelids alike.

== Breed ==
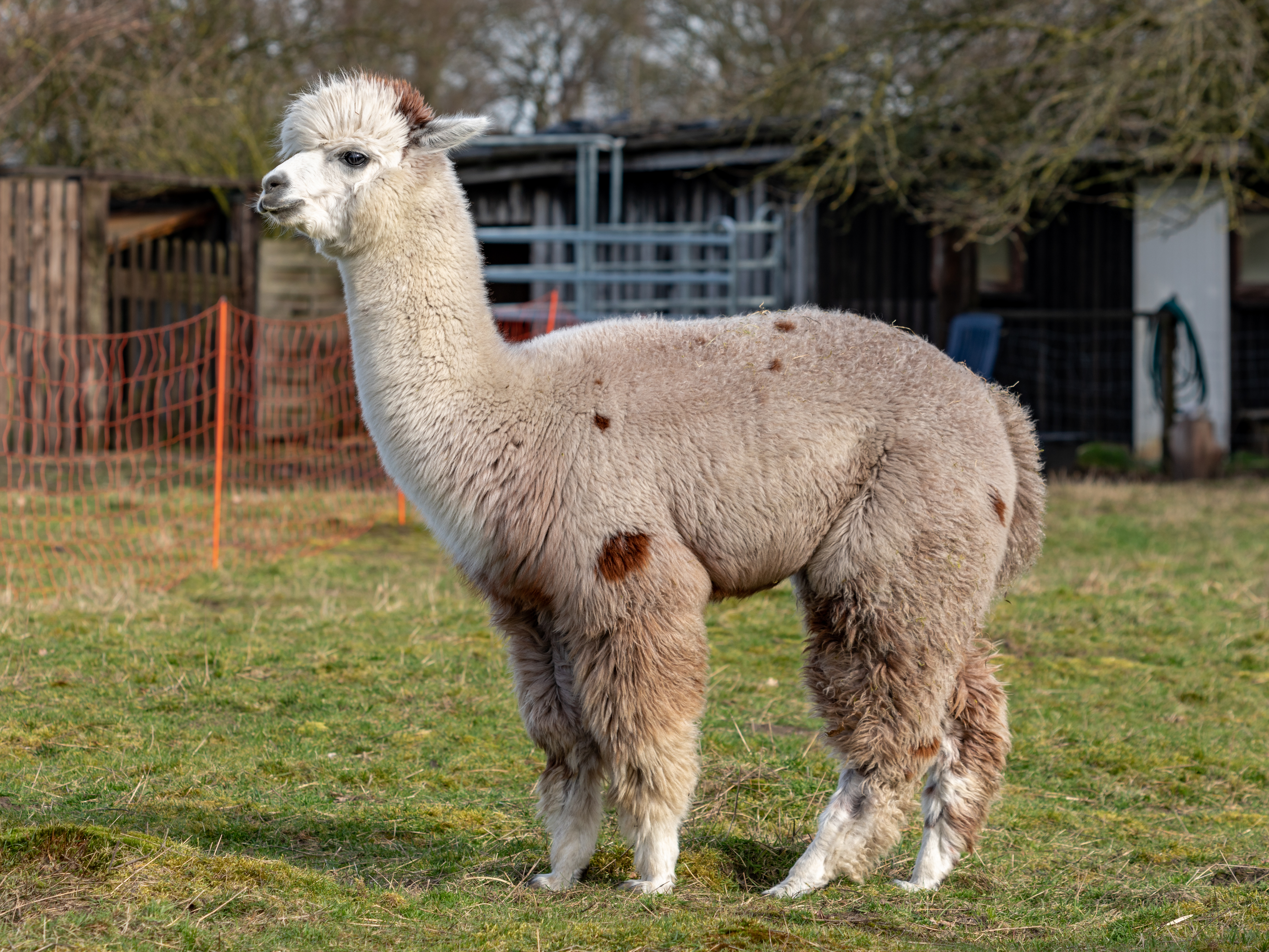
A Huacaya alpaca

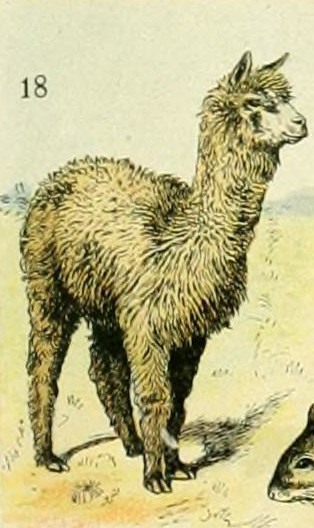
A drawing of a Huacaya alpaca

The Huacaya alpaca is one of two breeds of alpaca, the other breed being the Suri alpaca. Both breeds were first domesticated by the Incas thousands of years ago from a wild species of camelid, the vicuña. The native homeland of the Huacaya is the Andean highlands of South America, called the Altiplano. It is 4,000 ft (1,200 m) above sea level and reaches into Peru, Chile, and Bolivia. In the 1980s, these Huacaya were imported to other countries including Australia, Canada, England, France, New Zealand, and the United States of America to set up alpaca industries internationally.

=== Population ===
Huacayas far outnumber their counterpart breed, the Suri alpaca. There are more than 3.6 million alpaca in Peru alone, and Huacaya alpacas make up 80% of that population. The worldwide alpaca population is estimated to be more than 90% Huacaya.

=== Appearance ===
The Huacaya alpaca is described as having a "wavy and spongy look" to its fiber compared to its counterpart breed, the Suri, which has "straight fiber with no crimp". Ideally, the conformation of a Huacaya should be correctly balanced by having a neck and legs that are two-thirds the length of the alpaca's back. As adults, the height up to their withers is 32–39 inches (81–99 cm).

== Fiber ==
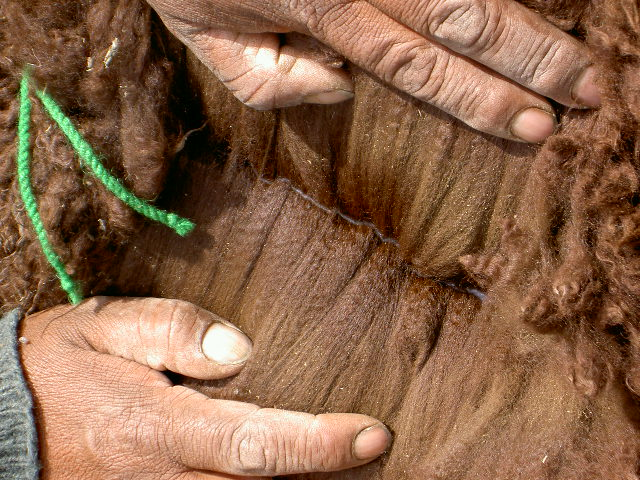
Huacaya alpaca fiber

Alpaca fiber is measured by its diameter in units called microns (μm). The size of a micron in comparison to a meter is 1/1,000,000th of a meter and in comparison to an inch, it is 1/25,400th of one inch. Fiber with lower micron counts is favored, because as the diameter increases so does the likelihood that the fiber will tear. Micron counts below 30 μm are used to form percentages that can predict the comfort level of the wool when worn with 90% of fibers under 30 μm being scored as a 90% comfort factor. The most frequent fiber diameter in U.S. Huacayas is 30 μm.

The length of Huacaya fiber is measured in millimeters (mm). In the U.S., the most frequent fiber length for Huacayas is 100 millimetres (3.9 in). A longer fiber length will improve how well the wool is spun and is associated with increased strength and consistency. A minimum fiber length of 71–101 millimetres (2.8–4.0 in) is required for processing in a commercial mill. Many alpaca farmers shear their Huacaya on a 12-month basis. Some farmers in South America shear their alpacas on a 14-16-month schedule to achieve higher fiber lengths.

Huacayas have a fiber feature that is distinct from Suri alpacas called crimp which refers to the waviness of the fibers in the fleece. It is measured in degrees per millimeter with <50 degrees/mm defined as a low crimp and >100 degrees/mm defined as a high crimp. When compared to the crimp present in sheep wool, which averages between 60–127 degrees/mm, Huacaya fiber has a low crimp ranging from 15–52 degrees/mm with a mean of 32 degrees/mm. In the U.S., the most frequent crimp measurement for Huacaya is 35 degrees/mm. A higher crimp measurement is associated with a heavier fleece, lower micron count, and greater uniformity and is valued in some alpaca shows.

There are 22 varieties of coat color recognized in Huacaya alpacas including "black, brown, grey, caramel, red, fawn, and white". However, these categories do not reflect the reality that alpaca coats present themselves in a color gradient with appearances of unique patterns and speckles.

== Behavior ==
=== Social structure ===
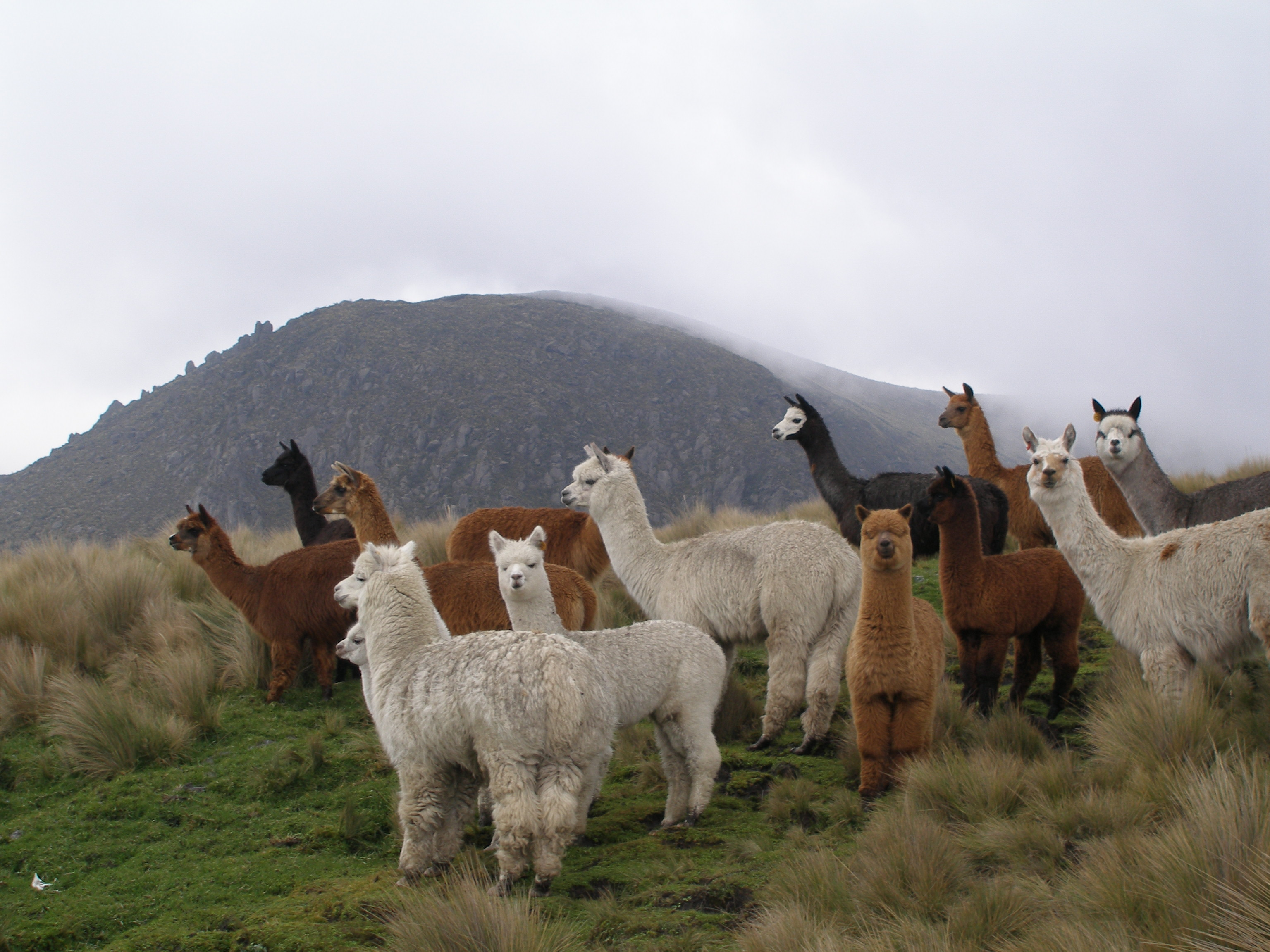
A Huacaya alpaca herd

Alpacas are herd animals and will gather together in a large mass to retreat when confronted with a threat. A male leader, termed the alpha, will take responsibility for herd protection and will display defensive behaviors such as biting, bumping, or kicking in the face of danger. Female alpacas and infants called crias will defer to the alpha male when the herd is integrated. In livestock production, females and males are often separated to reduce unintentional breeding. In this case, a hierarchy among females will form based on age. The youngest alpaca will hold the lowest status and exhibit submissive body language when approached by a higher-ranking alpaca. This body language looks like a lowering of the head, flattening of the ears, and turning up of the tail.

Once the hierarchy is established, alpacas will settle into relationships between themselves and other alpacas they have contact with for long periods of time. Therefore, it is best for the animal' welfare not to separate familiar alpacas. These relationships can be identified by noticing if alpacas are grazing close to each other, resting with each other, or exchanging soft humming sounds often. These vocalizations are the alpacas' way of talking to each other.

=== Predation ===
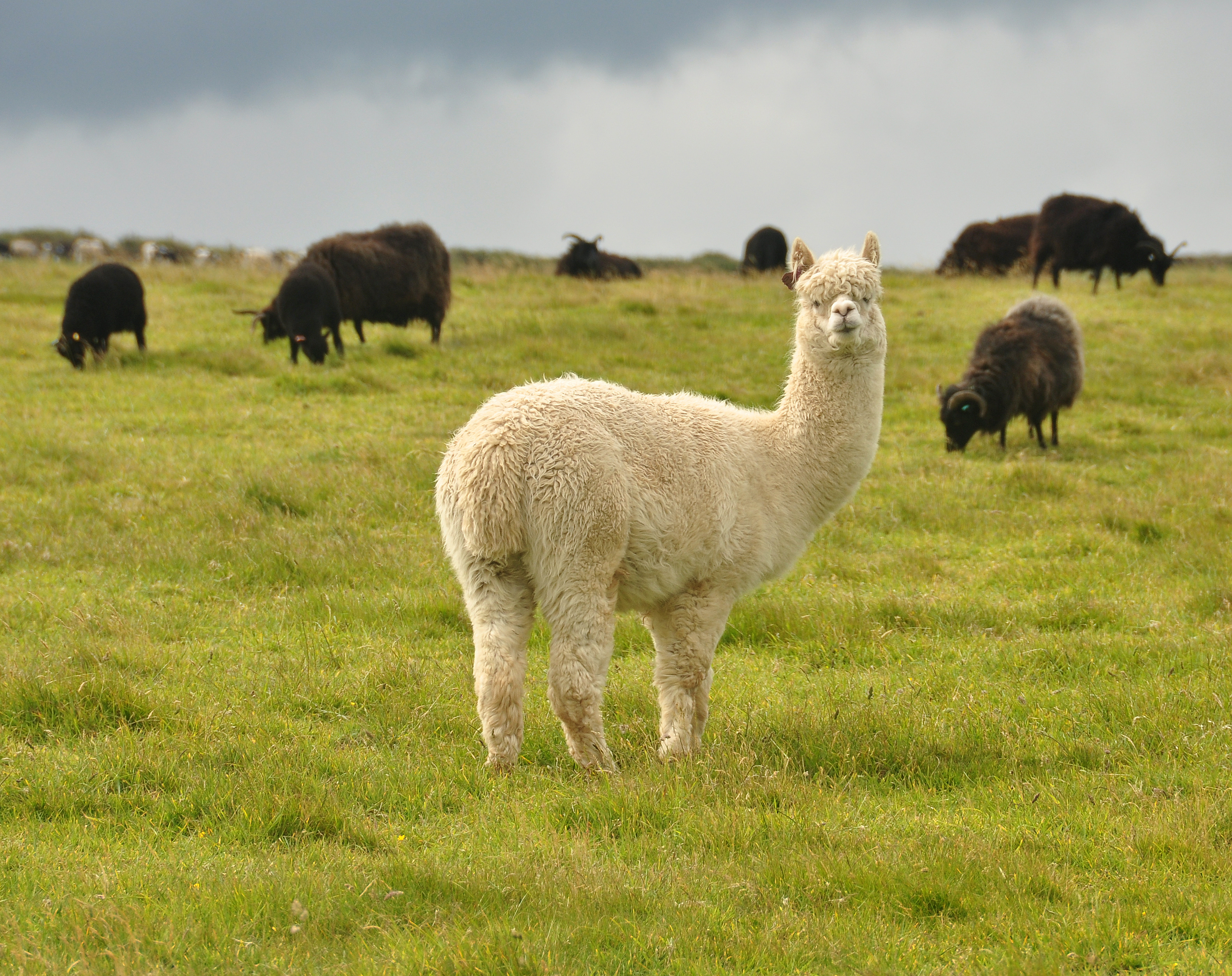
A Huacaya alpaca guards sheep.

Common predators for alpacas include aggressive domesticated dogs, mountain lions, coyotes, wolves, black bears, grizzly bears, foxes, and eagles. The risk of attacks from these predators is higher in rural areas where wildlife habitats overlap with alpaca pasture. Guardian animals can be used to protect alpacas from predators including the use of a guard dog and the integration of llamas and donkeys into the herd.

Alpacas themselves can be used as guardian animals for sheep and goats. While they have a docile nature towards humans, they create strong bonds with other prey animals they don't find threatening and are very protective of these relationships. Alpacas can exhibit defensive behaviors in the face of canines they are unfamiliar with and will pursue and kick aggressors.

== Biology ==
Huacayas are organized into a suborder of ruminants called Tylopoda because they have three compartments to their stomach, and their feet consist of two padded toes that end in claws. They only have incisors on the lower jaw which grind food against a dental pad on the roof of their mouths to chew.

Huacaya young have a birth weight ranging from 8–23 pounds (3.6–10.4 kg) and grow into an adult weight of 105–108 pounds (48–49 kg).

=== Diet ===
Huacaya alpacas share digestive tract anatomy with their biological family, Camelidae. Camelids are herbivore ruminants classified into a special suborder, Tylopoda, because they only have three stomach compartments. They are not considered "true ruminants" like cattle, sheep, and goats which have four stomach compartments. Similar to true ruminants, camelids regurgitate swallowed food and chew on it to further break down the material. This act is referred to as remastication or chewing cud, and it makes camelids adept at digesting fiber.

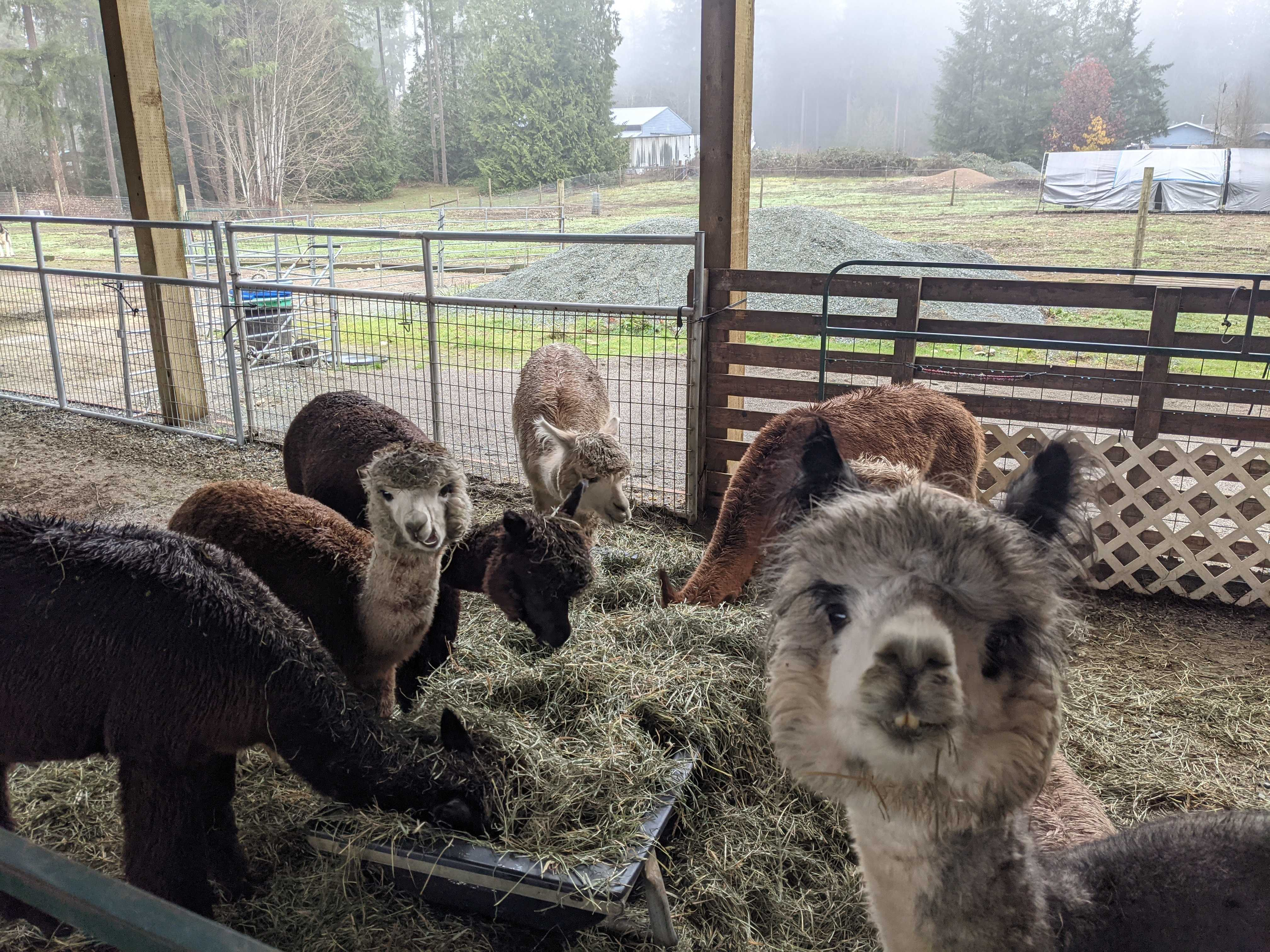
Huacaya alpacas eating hay

Alpacas require a dry matter intake of 1.8% of their body weight. Dry matter intake refers to the amount of feed eaten minus the water weight of that feed. So, the only aspect that is being measured is the forage and not the water. This is important to consider when comparing dry feeds which have <10% water content and pasture grass which has >80% water content.

Alpacas as livestock can be provided a free range of forages in the form of pasture grasses and legumes (alfalfa or clover hay). Protein and calcium levels are higher in hay than in grasses, which makes hay a nutritious addition to an alpaca's diet. Feeding alpacas grains is another way to provide carbohydrates for energy, but not protein or minerals. This is why grains are better to be used as a small supplement to an alpaca's diet. Overfeeding grain can generate an excess of lactic acid in the alpaca's stomach in a process called acidosis.

=== Poisons ===
When giving alpacas free range in pastures, it is important to take into account the possible poisonous plants they may have access to. Ornamental flowers such as the geranium, African daisy (including Osteospermum spp.), and arum lilies are toxic to alpacas. Certain shrubs such as horsebrush, rhododendron, and Russian thistle are also poisonous. Weeds including arrowgrass (the Triglochin spp. T. maritima and T. palustris), bracken fern, cocklebur, and death camas are dangerous and should be removed from an alpaca's pasture.

Insecticides, heavy metals, and mold are other poisons. Insecticide-sprayed pasture or grasses grown from soil polluted with lead, mercury, and copper are deadly to alpacas. Mold is most commonly encountered in moldy hay due to humidity, storage conditions, and wetness. Moldy hay should never be fed to alpacas because while some molds are harmless, others can kill.

=== Disease ===
Alpacas are very susceptible to parasites due to their grazing when parasites attached to grasses and soil are orally ingested. Common parasites for alpacas include lungworms, tapeworms, liver flukes, coccidia, mites, lice, ticks, and nasal bot. Dewormer shots can be given and crop rotation utilized to reduce the risk for parasites.

Bacterial diseases including anthrax, brucellosis, Johne's disease, and leptospirosis can be deadly, resulting in abortions or the death of alpacas that ingest the bacterial spores. For some bacterial infections, antibiotics can be given as treatment. However, in cases such as brucellosis, no vaccine has been developed for alpacas.

Common viral diseases for alpacas include rabies, foot-and-mouth disease, West Nile virus, and vesicular stomatitis virus. There are similarly few vaccines for viral diseases in alpacas as there are bacterial vaccines. In the case of rabies, there is no treatment and the death rate is 100%. Prevention is a more effective method of addressing viral diseases and requires the quarantine of any sick animals.

Fungal diseases that impact alpacas include aspergillosis, coccidioidomycosis, and dermatophytosis. Treatment consists of the use of antifungal agents and topical ointments. The best preventative measure is to disinfect surface areas that sick alpaca have had contact with.
