= Animal fiber =

Natural fiber from animals like silk worms and sheep

Animal fibers or animal fibres (see spelling differences) are natural fibers that consist largely of certain proteins. Examples include silk, hair/fur (including wool) and feathers. The animal fibers used most commonly both in the manufacturing world as well as by the hand spinners are wool from domestic sheep and silk. Also very popular are alpaca fiber and mohair from Angora goats. Unusual fibers such as Angora wool from rabbits and Chiengora from dogs also exist, but are rarely used for mass production.

Not all animal fibers have the same properties, and even within a species the fiber is not consistent. Merino is a very soft, fine wool, while Cotswold is coarser, and yet both Merino and Cotswold are types of sheep. This comparison can be continued on the microscopic level, comparing the diameter and structure of the fiber. With animal fibers, and natural fibers in general, the individual fibers look different, whereas all synthetic fibers look the same. This provides an easy way to differentiate between natural and synthetic fibers under a microscope.

== Silk ==
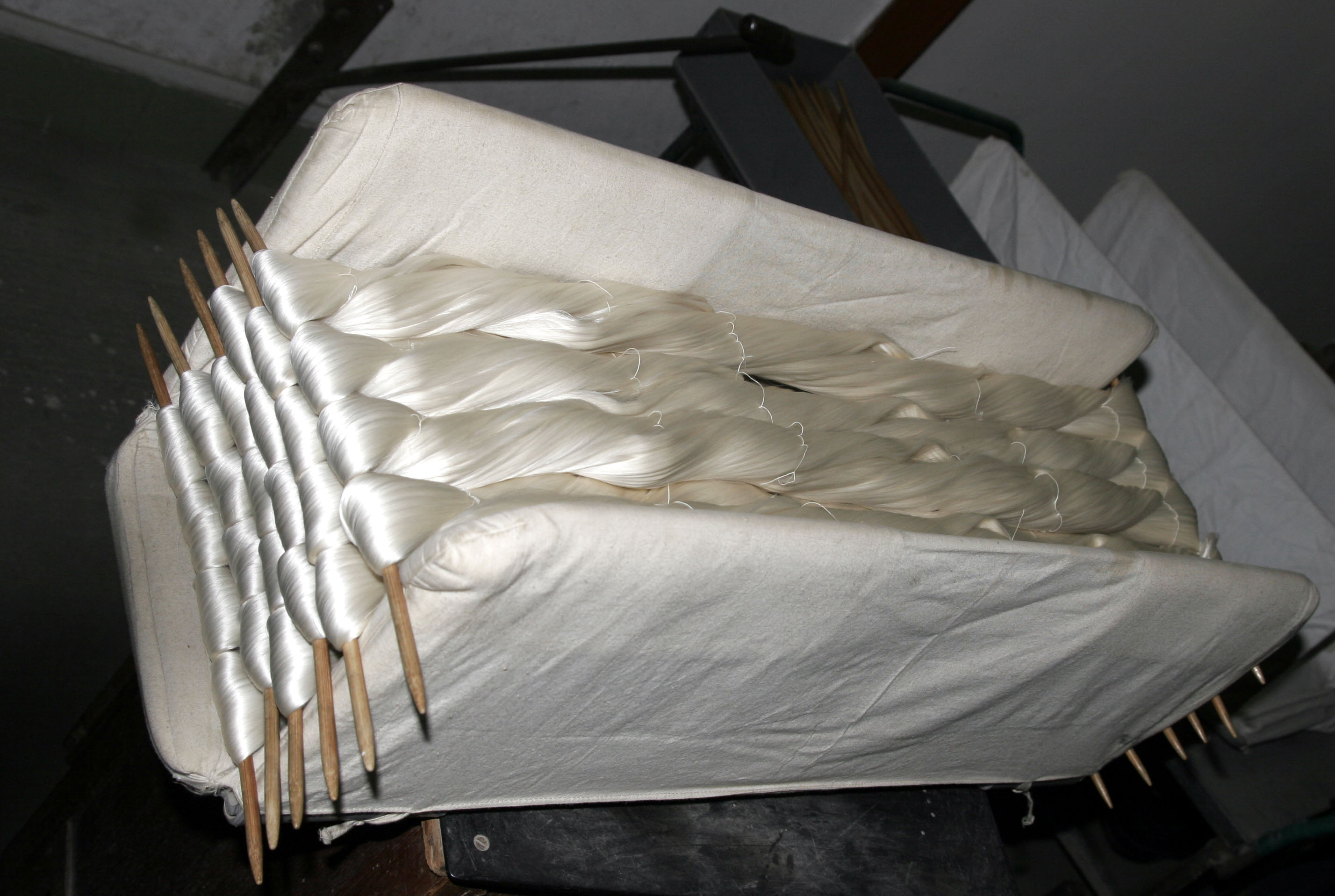
Raw silk

Silk is a "natural" protein fiber, some forms of which can be woven into textiles. The best-known type of silk is obtained from cocoons made by the larvae of the silkworm Bombyx mori reared in captivity. Rearing of silks is called sericulture. Degummed fibers from B. mori are 5-10 μm in diameter. The shimmering appearance for which silk is prized comes from the fibers' triangular prism-like cross-sectional structure which allows silk cloth to refract incoming light at different angles.

The length of the silk fiber depends on how it has been prepared. Since the cocoon is made of one strand, if the cocoon is unwound carefully the fibers can be very long.

Spider silk is the strongest natural fiber known. The strongest dragline silk is five times stronger than steel and three times tougher than Kevlar. It is also highly elastic, the silk of the ogre-faced spider can be stretched six times its original length without damage. As of 2005, there is no synthetic material in production that can match spider silk, but it is actively being sought by the U.S. military for such applications as body armor, parachutes and rope. Genetically engineered goats have been raised to produce spider silk in their milk at a cost of around $1,500 per gram.

== Wool ==
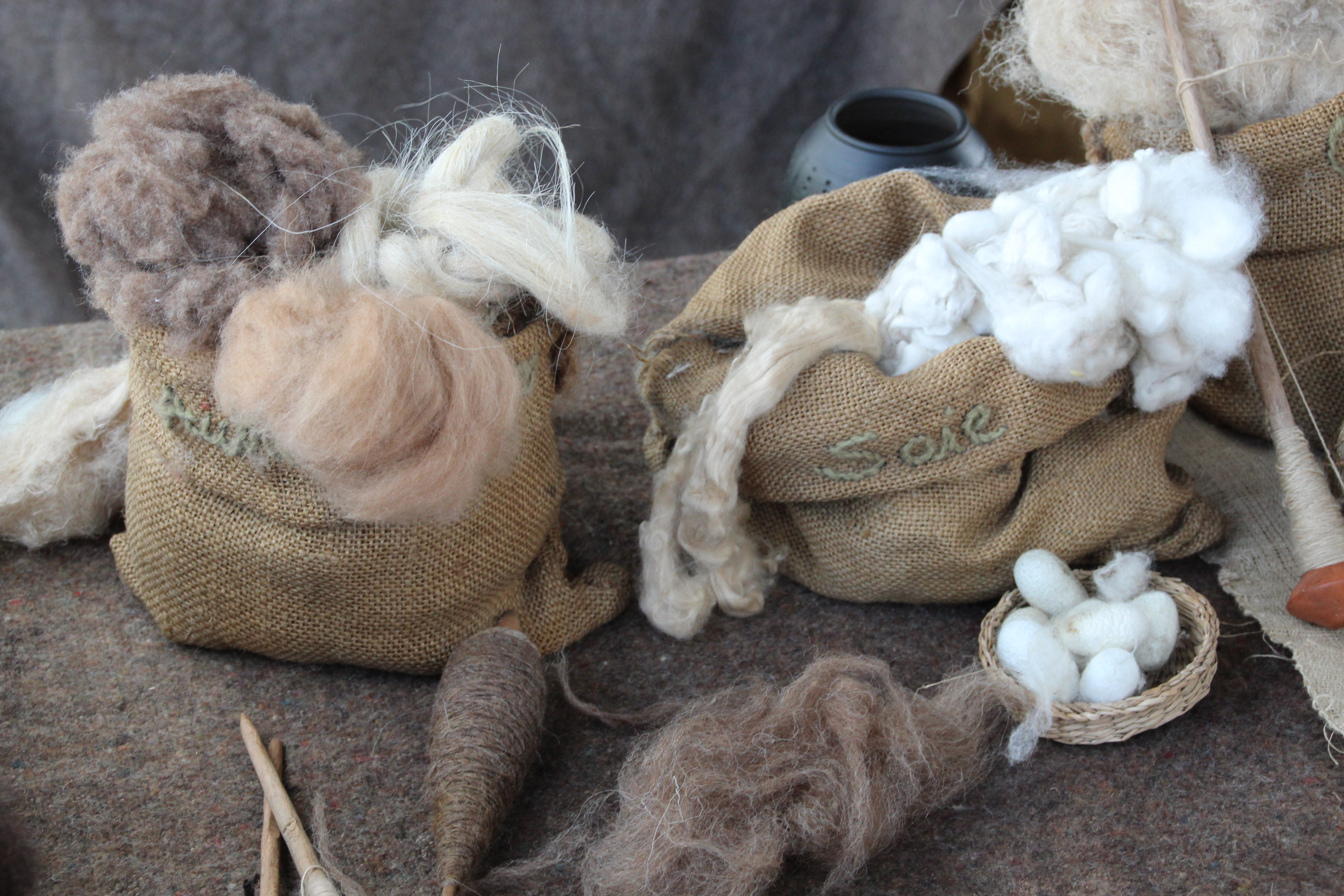
Wool

Wool is fiber derived from animal fur. Sheep are the principal source of wool, but fiber made from the hair of other mammals, such as alpacas, and rabbits, may also be called wool.

=== Alpaca ===
Alpaca fiber is sourced from alpacas. It is warmer than sheep's wool and lighter in weight. It is soft, fine, glossy, and luxurious. The thickness of the quality fiber is between 12-29 micrometers. Most alpaca fiber is white, but it also comes in various shades of brown and black. The most common type of alpaca fiber comes from a Huacaya.

=== Angora ===
Angora wool or Angora fiber refers to the down coat produced by the Angora rabbit. There are many types of Angora rabbits - English, French, German, and Giant. Angora is prized for its softness, thin fibers of around 12-16 micrometers for quality fiber, and what knitters refer to as a halo (fluffiness). The fiber felts very easily. Angora fiber comes in white, black, and various shades of brown.

=== Bison ===
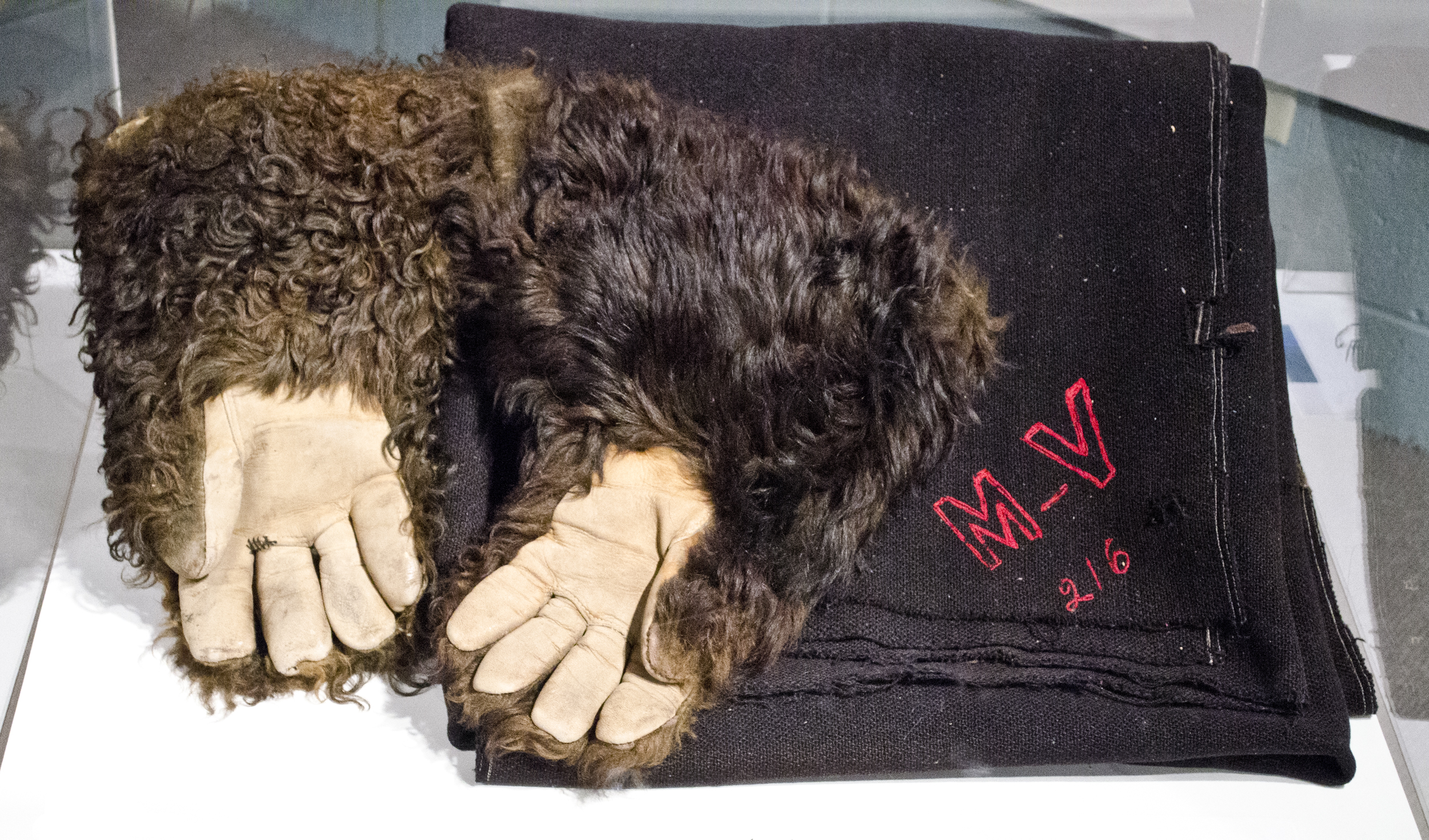
Bison-hair gloves and a wool blanket used by a stagecoach company

Bison fibers refer to the soft undercoat of the American bison. The coat of the bison protects the animal during harsh winter conditions, and consists of a coarse shiny overcoat, a coarse bulky midcoat, and a short dense undercoat. The undercoat is composed of fine, hollow guard hairs (average diameter of 59 micrometers) and down (average 18.5 micrometers). Downy fibers are typically chosen for textile applications. Bison fibers are grey or red-brown and about 2.5 cm long.

=== Cashmere ===
Cashmere wool is wool obtained from the Cashmere goat. Cashmere is characterized by its luxuriously soft fibers, with high napability and loft. In order for a natural goat fiber to be considered Cashmere, it must be under 18.5 micrometers in diameter and be at least 3.175 centimeters long. It is noted as providing a natural lightweight insulation without bulk. Fibers are highly adaptable and are easily constructed into fine or thick yarns, and light to heavy-weight fabrics.

=== Mohair ===
Mohair is a silk-like fabric or yarn made from the hair of the Angora goat. It is both durable and resilient. It is notable for its high luster and sheen, and is often used in fiber blends to add these qualities to a textile. Mohair also takes dye exceptionally well.

=== Sheep's wool ===
Wool has two qualities that distinguish it from hair or fur: it has scales which overlap like shingles on a roof and it is crimped; in some fleeces the wool fibers have more than 20 bends per inch. Wool varies in diameter from below 17 micrometers to over 35 micrometers. The finer the wool, the softer it will be, while coarser grades are more durable and less prone to pilling.

=== Qiviut ===
Qiviut is the fine underwool of the muskox. Qiviut fibers are long (about 5 to 8 cm), fine (between 15 and 20 micrometers in diameter), and relatively smooth. It is approximately eight times warmer than sheep's wool and does not felt or shrink.

== Fiber from other animals ==
Hand spinners also use fiber from animals such as llamas, camels, yak, and possums. These fibers are generally used in clothing.

Hair from animals such as horses is also an animal fiber. Horsehair is used for brushes, the bows of musical instruments and many other things. Along with mink hair, it's also a common choice for eyelash extensions and similar cosmetics. The best artists brushes are made from Siberian weasel, many other fibers are used including ox hair and hog bristle. Camel-hair brushes are usually made from squirrel, cheaper ones from pony, but never camels. Chiengora is dog hair.

Wool from a wide range of animals can be used for handicrafts and garments. The table below lists a variety of animal fibers and the approximate average diameter of each.

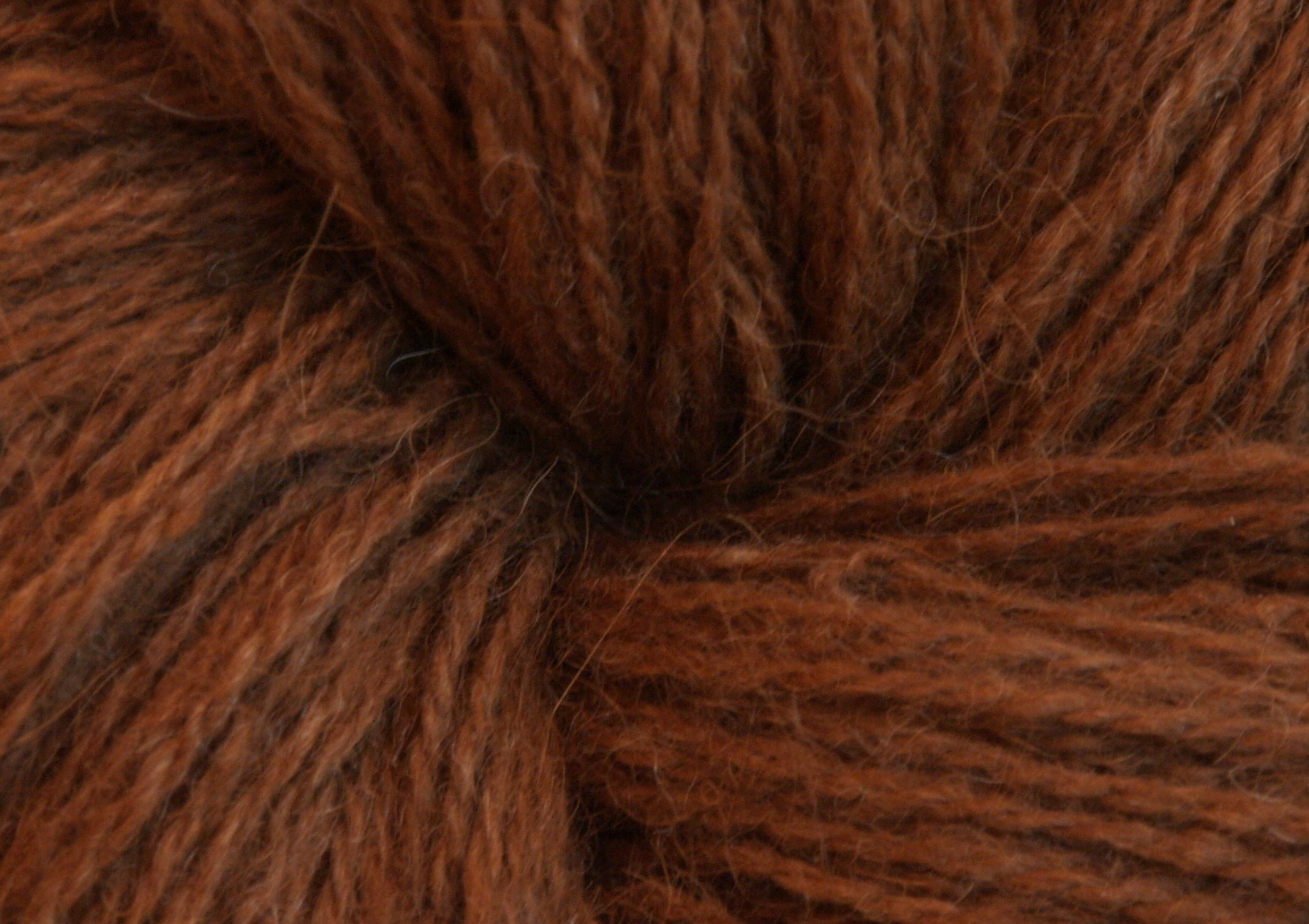
Handspun llama yarn from Patagonia

Average diameter of some of the finest, natural fibers
Animal	Fiber diameter (micrometres)
Vicuña	6–10
Alpaca (Suri)	10–15
Muskox (Qiviut)	11–13
Merino sheep	12–20
Angora rabbit (Angora wool)	13
Cashmere goat (Cashmere wool)	15–19
Yak (Yak fiber)	15–19
Camel (Camel hair)	16–25
Guanaco	16–18
Llama (Tapada)	20–30
Chinchilla	21
Angora goat (Mohair)	25–45
Huacaya alpaca	27.7
Llama (Ccara)	30–40

== See also ==
- Animal products
