= List of textile fibres =

Textile fibres or textile fibers (see spelling differences) can be created from many natural sources (animal hair or fur, cocoons as with silk worm cocoons), as well as semisynthetic methods that use naturally occurring polymers, and synthetic methods that use polymer-based materials, and even minerals such as metals to make foils and wires. The consumer protection laws requires that fibre content be provided on content labels.

== Animal-based fibres ==
Fibre	Source	Attribute
Alpaca	Alpaca	Soft, warmth, lightweight
Angora wool	Angora rabbit	Softness, blends well with other fibres
Byssus	Pinna nobilis	Warmth, lightweight
Camel hair	Arabian ña / Guanaco / South America camelid varieties	Softness, warmth
Cashmere wool	Indian cashmere goat	Softness
Chiengora	Dog	Fluffy, lightweight
Lambswool	Sheep	Softness, elasticity, warmth
Llama	Llama	Lightweight, insulating
Mohair wool	Angora goat	Dyes well, lightweight
Qiviut	Muskoxen	Softness, warmth
Rabbit	Rabbits	Softness
Silk	Silk worm (Bombyx mori)	Smooth, strong fabric finish with high shine
Eri silk	Silk worm (Samia cynthia)	Smooth, strong fabric finish with high shine
Spider silk	Golden Orb-weaver Spider (Nephila inaurata madagascariensis); transgenic silk worm; transgenic yeast	Ultra-strong, golden, smooth fabric finish with high shine
Vicuña	Vicuña	Expensive, luxurious, soft
Wool	Sheep	Warmth
Yak fiber	Wild Yak	Heavy, warmth

== Plant-based fibres (cellulosic fibres) ==
Fibre	Source	Attribute
Abacá	Abaca plant	Thin, lightweight
Acetate	Wood Pulp	Lustrous, thermoplastic
Banana	Banana plant pseudostem/leaves	Warm, thick, durable
Kapok	Pentandra tree	Fluffy, soft and lightweight
Coir	Coconut	Strength, durability
Cotton	Shrub	Lightweight, absorbent
Flax	Herbaceous plant	Lightweight, absorbent, used to make linen
Hemp	Cannabis	Strength, durability
Ixtle	Agave	Strong, coarse
Jute	Vegetable plant in linden family	Strength, durability
Kenaf	Hibiscus cannabinus	Rough
Lyocell	Eucalyptus Tree	Soft, lightweight, absorbent
Modal	Beech tree	Softness, lightweight
Piña	Pineapple leaf	Soft, lightweight
Raffia	Raffia palm	Carpet/rough
Ramie	Flowering plant in nettle family	Heavy, tough
Rayon	Wood Pulp	Soft, lightweight, absorbent
Sisal	Agave sisalana	Strength, durability
Soy protein	Tofu-manufacturing waste	Wooly, lightweight

Other plant-based fibers:

- Bast fibre
- Cedar bark textile
- Esparto
- Fique
- Papyrus
- Straw

== Mineral-based fibres ==
Fibre	Source	Attribute
Asbestos		Fire-resistance, light weight, carcinogenic
Glass, Fibreglass	Mixed silicates	Fire-resistance, futuristic appearance in some Foil, fibres, wire

- Basalt fiber
- Copper
- Gold
- Steel

== Synthetic fibres ==
Fibre	Source	Attribute
Acrylic	Petroleum Products	Lightweight, warm, dries quickly
Kevlar	Aramids	Very strong
Modacrylic	Petroleum Products	Lightweight, warm, dries quickly
Nomex	Aramids	Chemical, electrical, and flame resistant
Nylon	Petroleum Products	Durable, strong, lightweight, dries quickly
Polyester	Petroleum Products	Durable, strong, lightweight, dries quickly
Spandex	Petroleum Products	Elastic, strong, lightweight
Rayon	Regenerated cellulose	Weak when wet

== See also ==
- Synthetic fiber
- Fibre
- Textile
- Textile manufacturing
- Textile manufacturing terminology
- Timeline of clothing and textiles technology
- Units of textile measurement
