= Haircloth =

Type of fabric

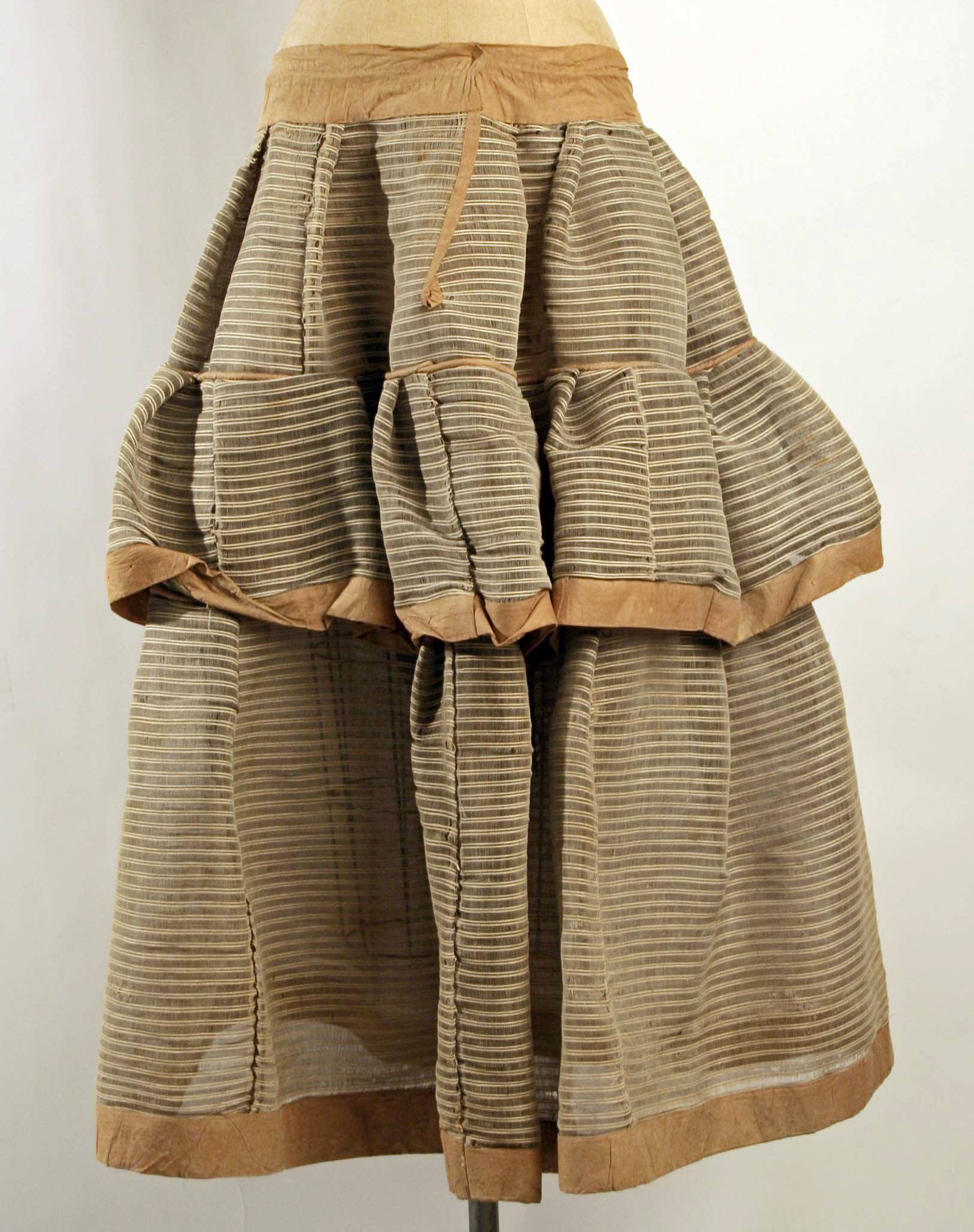
Horsehair crinoline, 1840s (MET)

Haircloth is commonly understood as a stiff, unsupple fabric made from coarse fibre from camelids, bovines, horses, goats, rabbits, hares and reindeers. However, a softer variation is valued in the textile and fashion industries for their rarity, aesthetics and comfort. This is because there are two types of hair used in making haircloth; a rougher outer “guard coat”, and a softer undercoat. The outer coats are used in coarse fabrics, often applied to upholstery, carpets, underskirts and hairshirts, or cilices, while "luxury fabrics" use the softer undercoat.

== Description ==
Haircloth is woven or knitted with fibres of uncommon animal varieties, including the following:

1. Mohair from the Angora goat, originating from Turkey.
2. Cashmere comes from the Himalayan cashmere goat of Central and Southwestern Asia. It is mostly produced in China, and is a popular Scottish knitting yarn. Cashmere from the Indian sub-continent is referred to as Pashmina. The fibres of Pashmina come from Changthangi goats of Jammu and Kashmir, in Leh and Ladakh.
3. Cashgora, a mix of Cashmere and Angora fibres, produced mainly in New Zealand.
4. Pygora, a mix of the Pygmy and Angora goat, raised for hand-spinning in Dalla, Canada.
5. Angora silk comes from the Angora rabbit, also known as "silk Rabbits", from Ankara, Turkey. It is farmed in France, England, Germany and China for its hair.
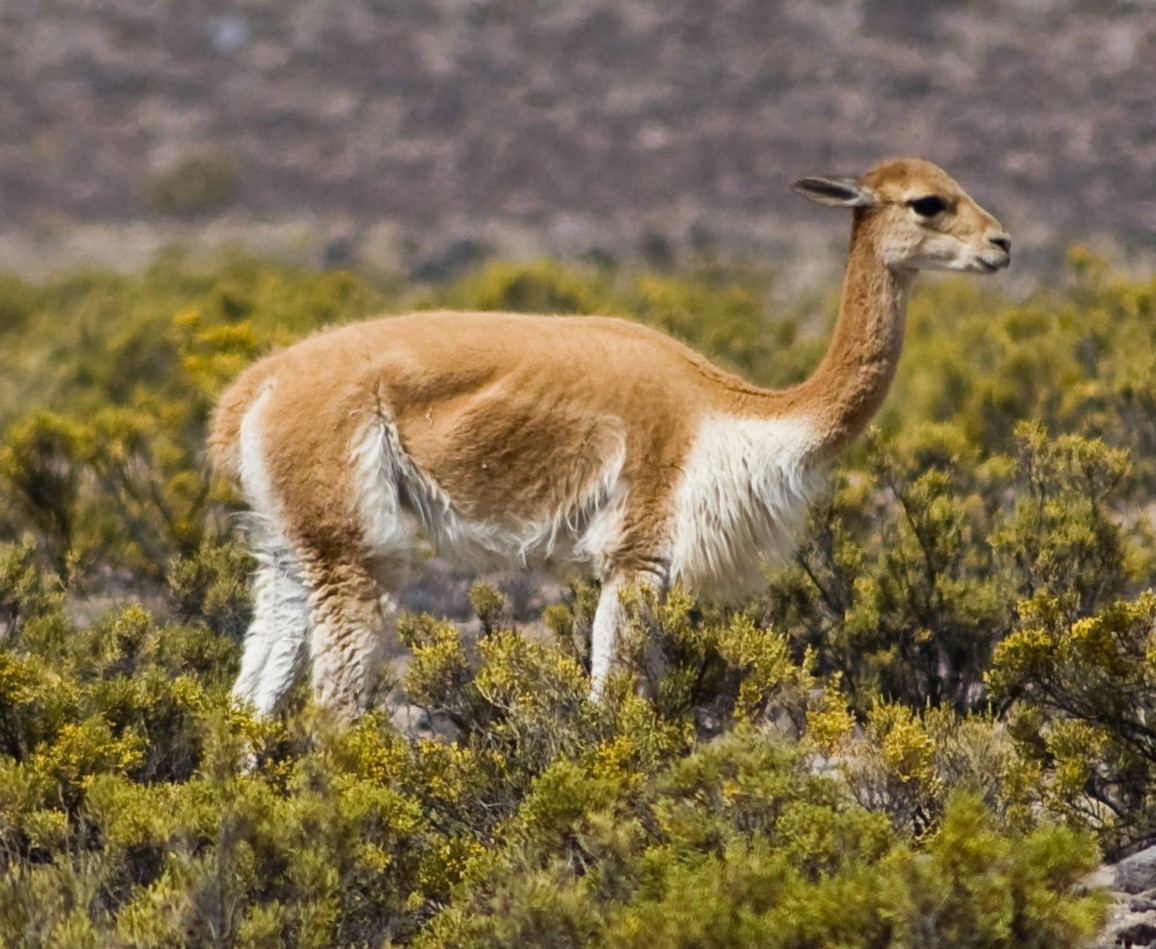
  Vicuña (Vicugna vicugna) in Peru.
6. Common Goat hair produced mainly in Greece and Argentina.
7. Reindeer hair from Scandinavia,
8. Chiengora, or dog hair is being explored as an alternative fibre for sustainable fashion. However, due to inefficient procurement and production methods, the fibre has yet to be adopted industrially.
9. Vicuña comes from the fur of a South American Camelid, the vicuña. Its fibre is soft and insulating but short and difficult to procure. Its rarity is reflected in the price of its wool and yarn.

Other sources of hair for "haircloth" include bovines; namely, Yak, produced in Manchuria, Nepal and India, Bison, Musk Ox— also known by its Inuit name "qiviut". Camelids which are farmed for their hair include Guanaco, Llama and Alpaca and camels. Such hair fibres show a convergence in chemical composition, namely in the presence of α-keratin proteins and amino acids, among which Cashmere, wool and Mohair are most similar. Climatic differences and nutrient availability in the habitats of each source animal defines minute differences in the chemical structure of their hair. These structures define the quality of the resulting fibres’ much desired lustre and downiness.

== Uses ==
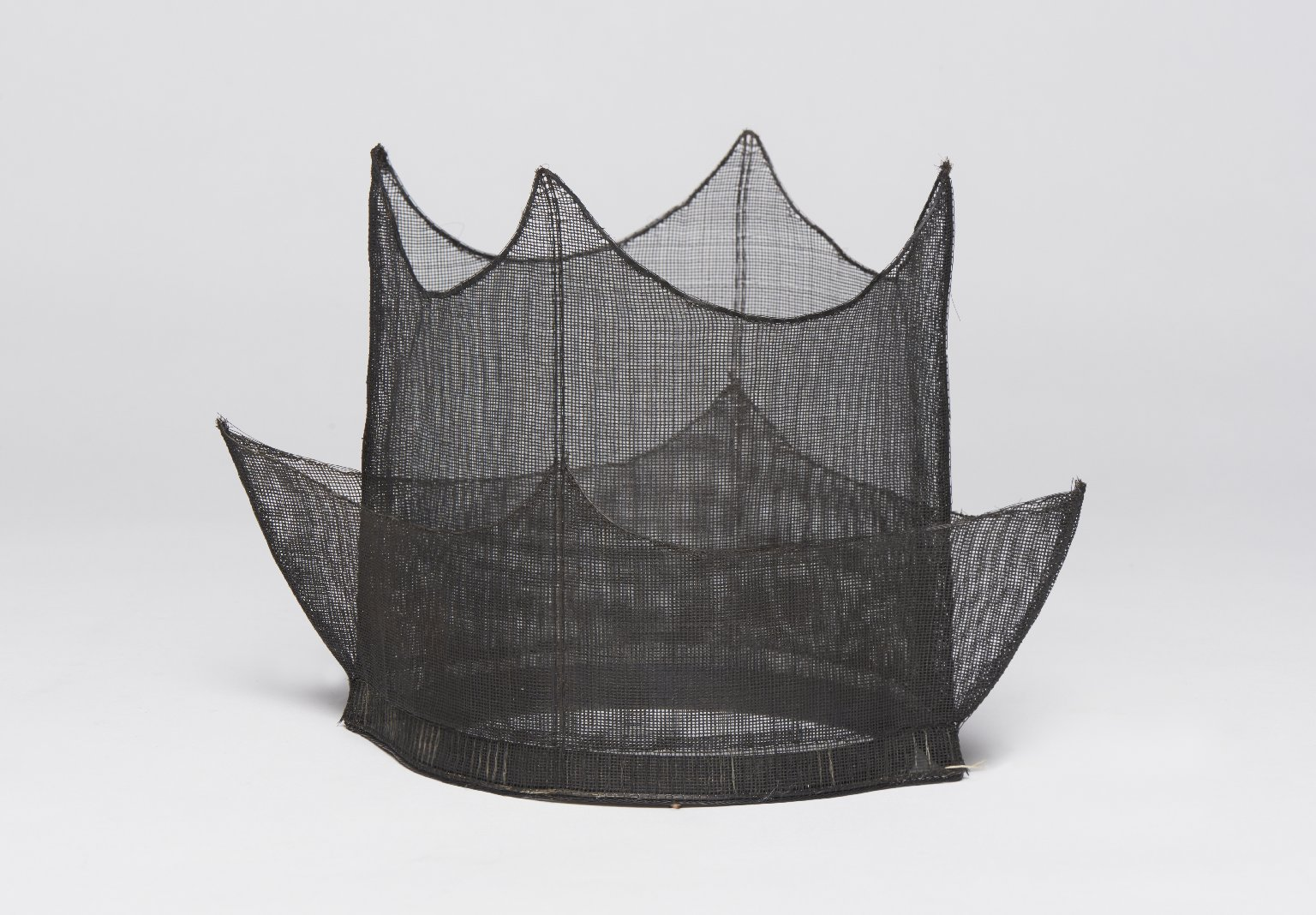
Korean, Jeongjagwan hat made from Horsehair, 19th century. Brooklyn Museum, Brooklyn Museum Collection.

Textiles from horse-tail hair are used in upholstery fabric, light hairs being reserved for dyes and black being used as is for their distinctive natural hue. Hair cloth has also been used in the panels of men's suit jackets. The wearing of haircloth was often also associated with the poverty and religious ascetism. There are suggestions that woven tent coverings of black goat hair were used in the 1st century CE in Cilicium, Turkey. Human hair has been woven in fabrics of ancestral worship and, as woven mats, suggested as possible solutions to water pollution. However, it has also been used to dehumanise communities in times of war. During the Holocaust of World War II, the hair of Polish Jews in Auschwitz were used by the SS in the manufacture of coarse fabrics.

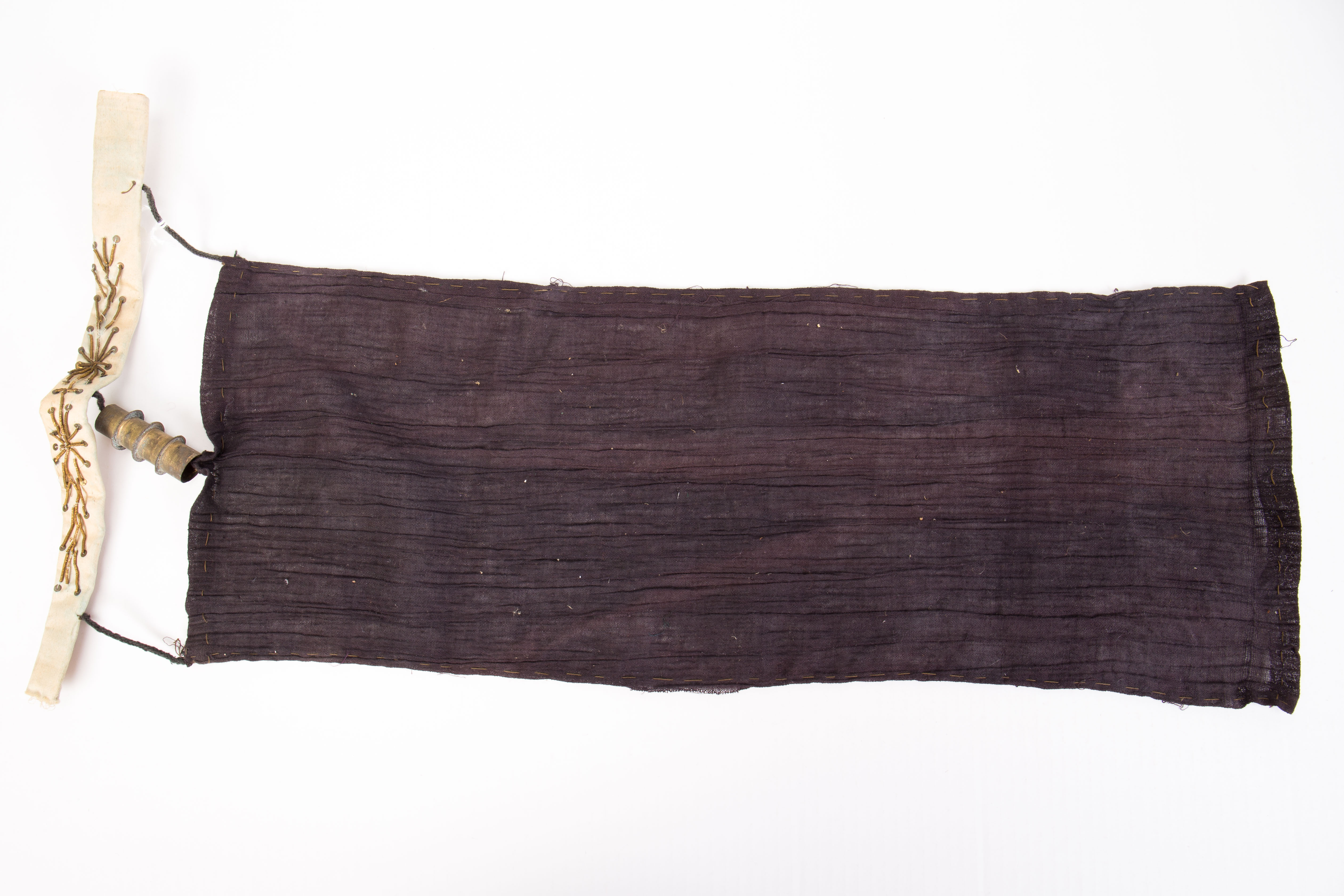
Yashmak veil with a gold embroidered brow strap, 20th century. Produced in Egypt. Auckland Museum Collection.

=== Suit construction ===
In tailoring applications, haircloth is woven using cotton warp and horsehair weft. In traditional suit construction, haircloth is used to stiffen the front panels in men's suit jackets, and Savile Row tailors still make bespoke suits this way. However, in modern suits, haircloth is often replaced with synthetic fabrics.

=== Horse hair veils ===
Horse hair veils, known as burqa, were worn by women from the Persian Gulf in the late 19th century. This fashion trend then spread among the women of Afghanistan through wives of the upper-classes. A similar fashion is seen in Istanbul, Turkey, peche and lisam of the 16th century, and the yashmak of the 17th and 18th are also made of horsehair. Literary works and illustrations recorded as early as the 12th century reveal a longer tradition of this haircloth veil culture in Iran.

=== Hair-skirts ===
Hair-skirts are undergarments worn as support under dresses and skirts by exploiting the stiffness of haircloth. Horsehair underskirts, known as Mamigun, or Maweiqun, were worn by entertainers, military officials, upper class and civil servants in Ming Dynasty China. This is attributed to the influences of a shared cultural sphere between Joseon Korea and Jiangnan established through lesser known trade routes. "Hair cloth" also referred to crinolines, or "crinoline cloth", in mid 19th century Europe as it was woven with linen to add volume and shape to ladies' skirts. A smaller, lesser known version of this known as the tournoure, or a "crinolette", used in the 1880s, was occasionally also made of stiff haircloth.

=== Horse-hair sieves ===
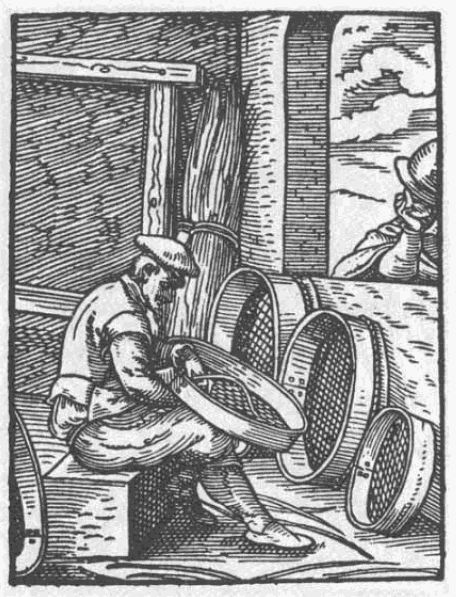
From Frankfurt am Main, Germany. A man weaving the wooden frame of a sieve. Jost Amman and Hans Sachs, 16th century.

In Scandinavia, central Europe and Asia, horsehair sieves were crafted by common folk of Sweden, Slovenia and Japan. In Škofja Loka, this was exported to the rest of Continental Europe, Africa and Asia minor. When the sieve trade saw a gradual decline in the late 19th century, horse fibres began to be used instead in tapestries. In Japan, hydrated horsehair sieves are used to sift paste in traditional cooking. It is labelled loosely today as nori-koshi (“paste filter”), but is most often known as koshiki (漉し器) or uragoshi (裏漉し), with many names depending on the region in question.

=== Haircloth mats ===
In 19th century Northern England, haircloth was employed in the drying of malt for brewing in place of perforated metals which would scorch the grain. It would be spread over the kiln floor to keep grain from dropping down into the furnace.

The rugs of the Darxad people of Northern Mongolia are an exception which use goathair despite difficulties in processing the fibre. This is likely due to influences of the neighbouring Turkic Oirad group. Hair is woven into thick threads which are then braided into blankets due to the insulating properties provided by the coarse knotting resulting from its manufacturing process. Another type of haircloth is the sack-like woven cloth from camel hair, “Ba. örmög”, traditionally used for rice sacks. However, the production method for these cloths have been largely forgotten.

=== Hairshirts, religion and devotion ===
The roughness of coarse hair textiles often associated it with devotion, and religious ascetism. In European Christian tradition, a cilice of haircloth was worn as a show of penitence. The textile was also used as banners, altar covers and girdles. Worn as an undergarment closest to the skin, it appears in some French medieval literature as embodied garments of sexuality and romantic devotion. The rough was used as bedspreads as a show of devotion in Gaul between the 5th and 9th centuries.

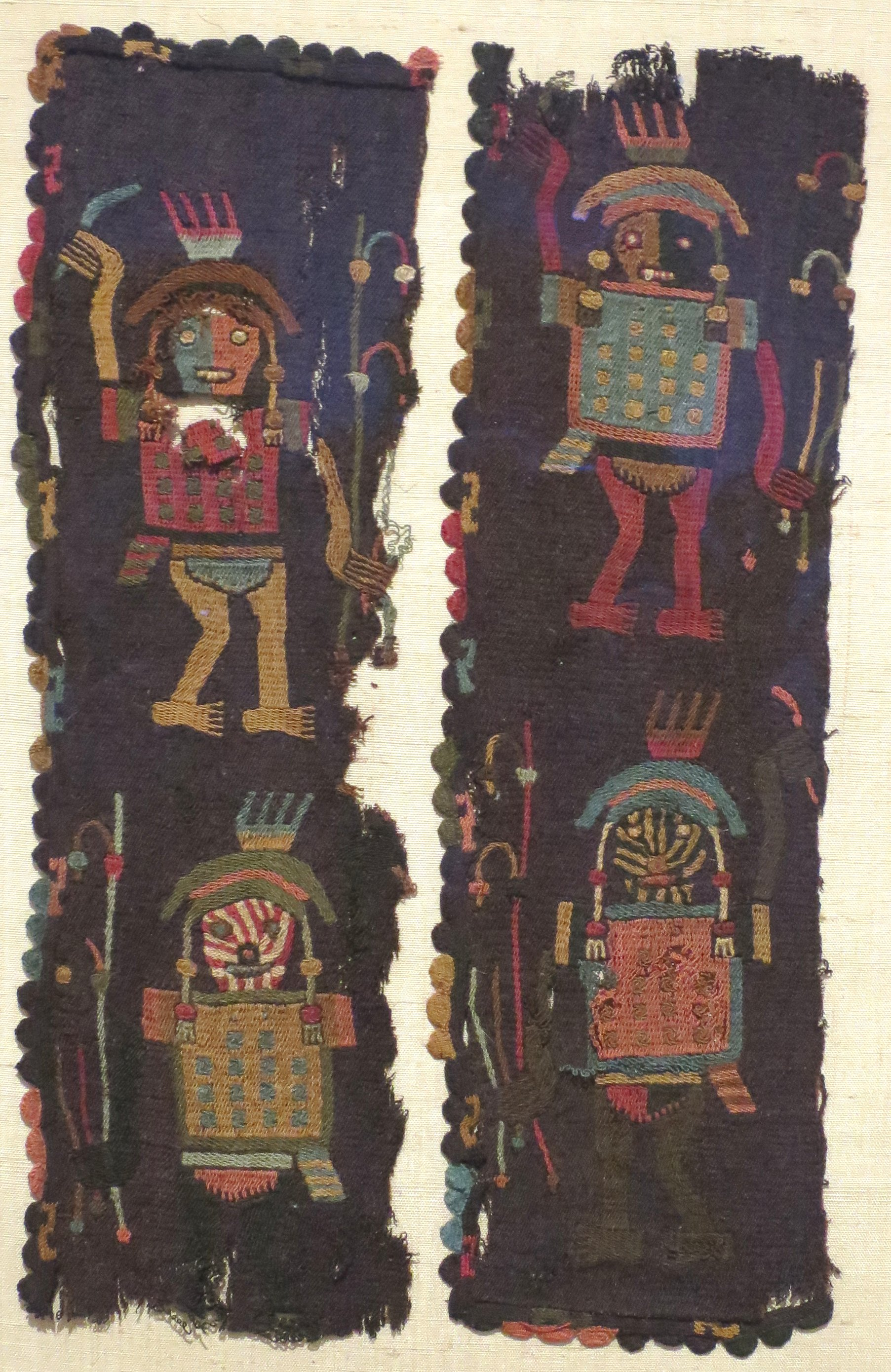
Paracas embroidered plain weave of camelid hair with needle-knitted border, c. 2nd to 1st century BCE. Honolulu Museum of Art. Photograph by Hiart

== History and archeology ==
Haircloth has been made and used since prehistory. Woven cloths, especially from goat, camel and horse fibres have been found in archeological sites around the world dating from the 8th century BCE to the 15th century CE.

=== Paracas textiles ===
Elaborate, brightly woven tapestries of vicuña, llama, human hair textiles were found at the Cavernas archeological dig-site of Paracas, Peru, in 1925, by Julio C. Tello. These haircloths are believed to be devotional artefacts carbon dated to approximately 200 BC E to 100C.E.. They belonged from an agrarian community who partook in ancestral worship, dubbed the Paracas community. They were used to wrap the bodies of the deceased community, most of whom are presumed to be priests or leaders of the commune.

=== Europe ===
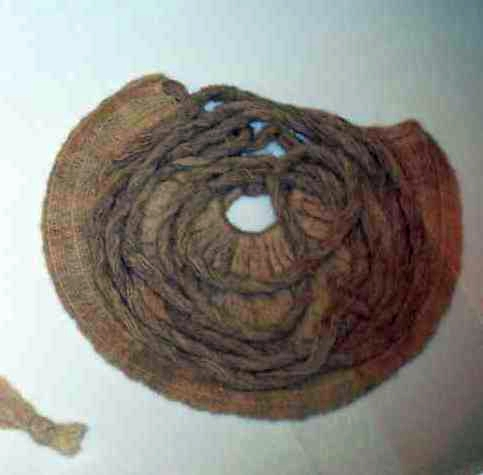
Reconstruction of hairnet from Skrydstrup grave. Bronze Age. Haderslev museum, Denmark.

Goat and mustelid hair was common in Medieval England. A woollen twill dating to the late 12th century and one cloth and four pile-woven mats of coarse goat hair, dating to the 15th and 13th centuries respectively, were found at medieval riverside embankments at Billingsgate Lorry Park, along the Lower Thames Street in 1982 and 1983.

In Hallsatt, Germany, belts of braided horsehair and wool have been found at an early Iron Age site, La Tène. This belt was woven ensure flexibility along its length, but rigidity along its width. In Skrydstrup, Denmark, a horse-hair net was found on a woman in a tree coffin from the 8th century BCE. In Hochdorf, Switzerland, soft badger hair was used for a chieftain’s overcoat, found in a grave dating to the 5th century BCE.

== Process ==
=== Procurement ===
Depending on the source and location of production, methods of procurement would differ. Goathair is often simply sheared or trimmed like wool. Reindeer hair can be sheared, but is also produced in the processing of the animal's fur. Haircloth making procedures are similar to those of wool. Chiengora can be obtained from pet salons post-grooming. The longer, stiffer guard coat is then separated from the softer undercoat by a process known as de-hairing.

=== Spinning ===
The thread is made if necessary before the cloth is produced by weaving, braiding or knitting. However, the smoothness of fibres cause difficulties in spinning processes or hair threads. To circumvent this, hairs are often mixed with other materials, or spun into thicker threads and yarns as in medieval London, resulting in a coarser texture. In Europe spinning was done with hooked shuttles, and in areas such as Mongolia and Arabia, it is done by hand and spindle. The Arab Bedouin women spin threads by hand, turning the spindle in one arm, while the other rolls the hair against their thigh to make a yarn.

=== Production ===
In Europe, damask cloth is made by threading the hairs into their warp with a hooked shuttle on a loom. Hairs used in weaving, if not first processed into yarn, tend to be shorter than required, and often require extensions by knotting and adding an adhesive to create a continuous weft. In Medieval London, the weaving and extending was often done by the weaver and his assistant respectively. Meanwhile, Mongolian haircloth can be braided with Kh.zoos širees, or “coin table”, where each thread is weighted equally by Chinese coppers to prevent warping of braids. Sometimes certain threads are more lightly weighted to create an intentional warping. The Da.danz is made by alternating weft threads on a circular warp, wound around a board from which the finished work will hang.
