= Horsehair bed =

Mattress type

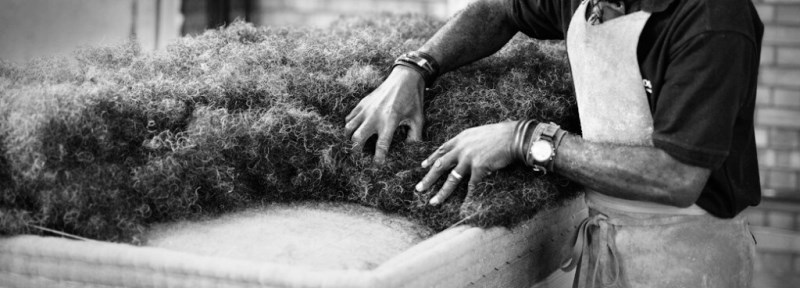
Handmade horsehair bed production

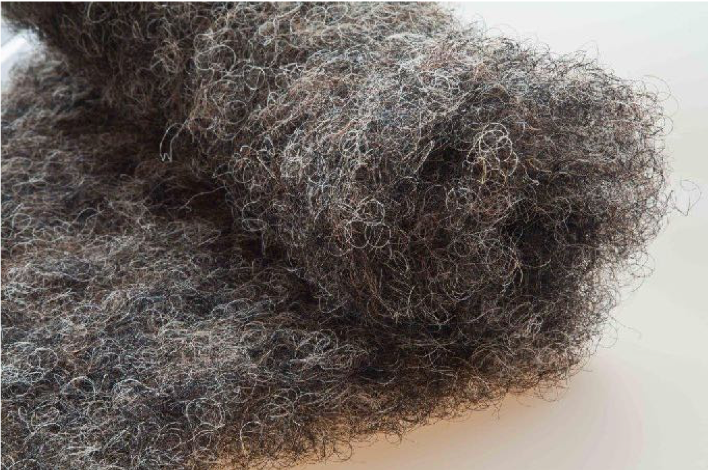
Horsehair mattress layer

A horsehair bed is a type of mattress filled with horsehair, typically sourced from the mane or tail of horses. Horsehair is valued for its resilience, breathability, and moisture-wicking properties, which make it an ideal natural filling material for bedding. It has been used in luxury mattresses since at least the 18th century, particularly in Europe.

Horsehair mattresses are noted for their temperature regulation and long-lasting support. The hollow structure of horsehair fibers allows for constant air circulation, keeping the bed dry and cool throughout the night. Although their use declined in the 20th century with the rise of synthetic materials, horsehair beds are still produced today by premium manufacturers and marketed as eco-friendly, durable alternatives to foam or spring mattresses.

The production of these beds tends to be quite difficult and expensive, as they are made entirely by hand. It takes approximately 350 hours to produce a mattress. Today, there are only a few companies and places in the world that produce them.

== History ==
The use of horsehair in bedding and upholstery dates back several centuries. In Europe, it became a preferred material for high-end mattresses during the 1700s and 1800s, often found in aristocratic homes and luxury furniture. As industrial methods evolved, horsehair was more widely available and used in both residential and commercial furnishings.

== Properties and Benefits ==
Horsehair is naturally hollow and highly elastic. These properties give it exceptional ventilation and the ability to recover its shape over time, making it both breathable and durable. Unlike many synthetic materials, horsehair resists mold, dust mites, and retains its structure for decades with minimal sagging.

Additionally, horsehair can absorb and release moisture efficiently, helping to regulate humidity in the sleeping environment.

== Manufacture ==
To prepare horsehair for use in bedding, the raw fibers are washed, combed, and often curled or twisted to increase their springiness. The processed hair is then layered or blended with other natural materials such as wool, cotton, or natural latex. Some manufacturers continue to use traditional hand-stuffing techniques.

== Modern use ==
Today, horsehair beds are considered niche or luxury items. High-end manufacturers such as Hästens (Sweden) and Vispring (UK) continue to produce handcrafted horsehair mattresses, sometimes using thousands of hand-tufts and taking several days to complete a single bed. These beds are popular in luxury hotels and among consumers seeking sustainable, natural sleep solutions.
