= Skrydstrup Woman =

Bronze Age woman found in Denmark

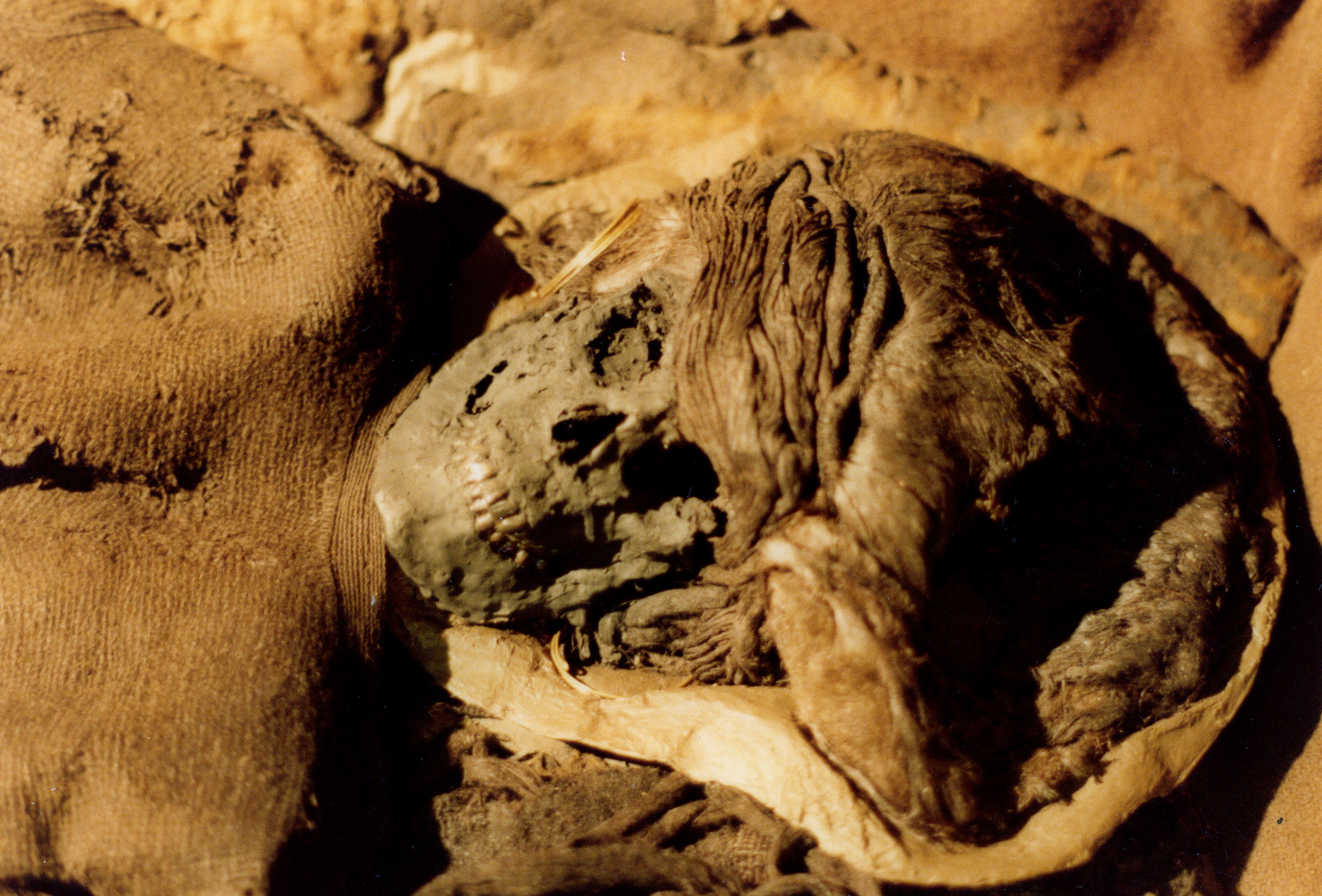
- The Skrydstrup Woman
- Born: c. 14th–12th century BCE; Southern Jutland, Denmark
- Died: c. 1382–1129 BCE; Skrydstrup, Denmark
- Occupation: Unknown (prehistoric individual)
- Known for: Exceptionally preserved Early Nordic Bronze Age burial
- Height: 171 cm (5 ft 7 in)

The Skrydstrup Woman was a young woman of the Nordic Bronze Age whose remains were buried in an oak coffin beneath a burial mound near Skrydstrup, in southern Jutland, Denmark. She died at about 18 or 19 years of age, sometime between 1382 and 1129 BCE. Her grave, excavated in 1935, is one of the best-preserved Bronze Age burials found in Denmark, with surviving hair, soft tissue, clothing and other organic material.

She was about 171 centimetres (5 ft 7 in) tall and was buried wearing finely made wool clothing, an elaborate hairstyle and gold spiral earrings. The exceptional preservation of her hair and teeth has allowed researchers to investigate her life using radiocarbon dating and isotope analysis. Studies published in 2015 and 2017 concluded that she spent much of her childhood outside the Skrydstrup area, moved there at about 13 or 14 years of age, and travelled again during the final two years of her life before returning shortly before her death. These findings have made the Skrydstrup Woman an important case in the study of mobility, dress and social connections in Bronze Age Europe.

== Discovery ==
The Skrydstrup Woman was discovered in 1935 during the excavation of a burial mound about 1 kilometre (0.62 mi) southwest of Vojens in southern Jutland. The excavation was directed by Christian M. Lund, manager of Museum Sønderjylland.

When archaeologists opened the mound, they found her inside a coffin hollowed from a single oak trunk near its centre. The mound had been built on a foundation of stone and originally measured about 13 metres (43 ft) in diameter and 1.75 metres (5.7 ft) high.

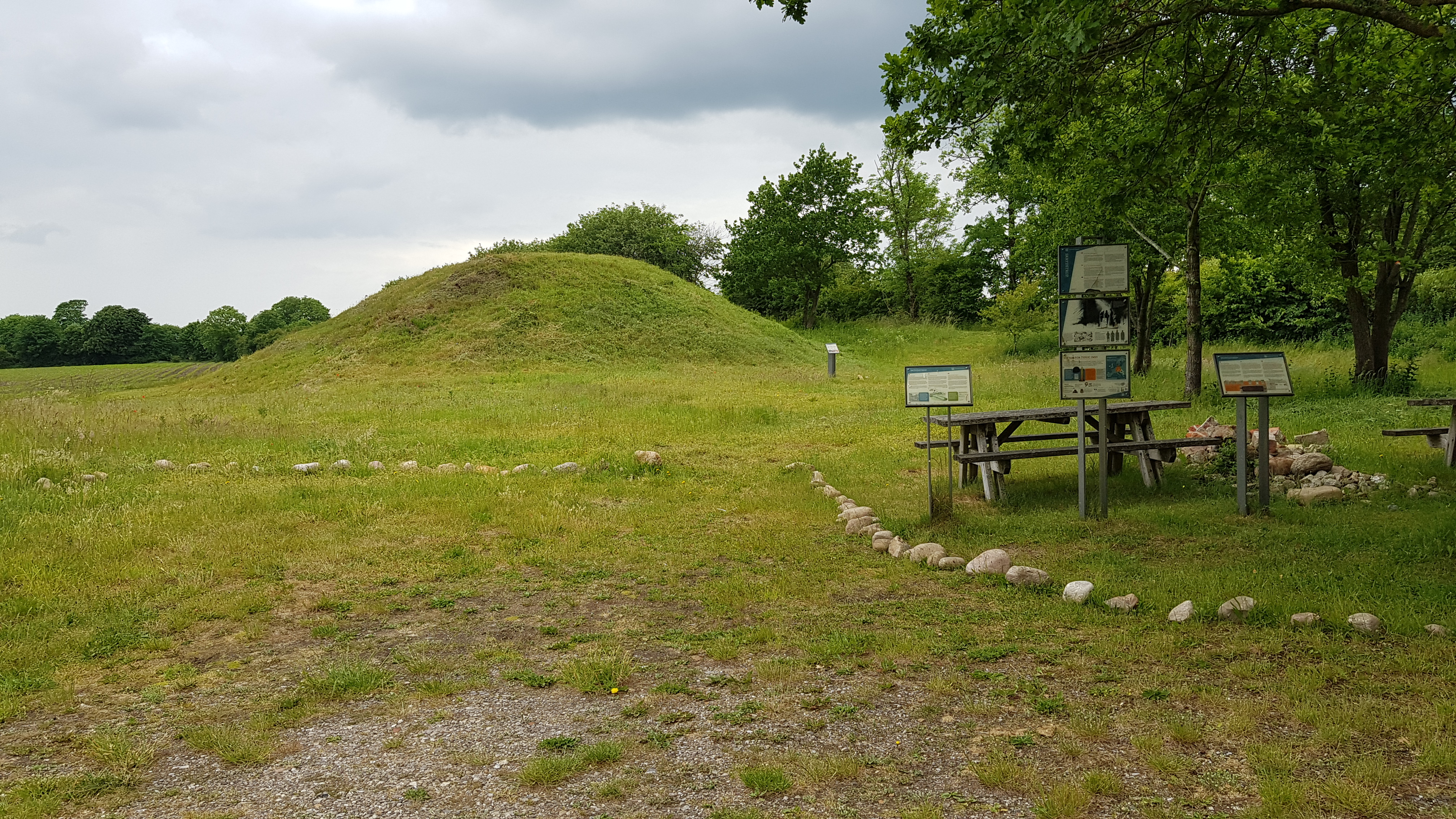
Skrydstrup Woman's burial mound

Sometime after her burial, the original mound was enclosed within a larger mound measuring about 24 metres (79 ft) in diameter and 4 metres (13 ft) high. During this later phase, the mound was reused for two additional burials, when two men were interred in separate oak coffins near its edge.

Over the centuries, the weight of the overlying mound caused the Skrydstrup Woman's coffin to collapse, crushing parts of her skeleton. Despite this damage, conditions inside the oak coffin preserved much of her hair, clothing and soft tissue, making her one of the best-preserved Bronze Age burials in Denmark.

== Condition and preservation ==
The remains of the Skrydstrup Woman were unusually well preserved for an Early Nordic Bronze Age inhumation. The oak coffin created a low-oxygen environment containing natural tannins that slowed the decay of soft tissue, hair and other organic materials.

Over the centuries, the weight of the overlying burial mound caused the coffin to collapse, crushing the skull, ribs, hand bones and several other skeletal elements. These damaged bones deteriorated more rapidly than the better-protected portions of the skeleton. Despite this damage, enough of the skeleton survived for detailed osteological examination.

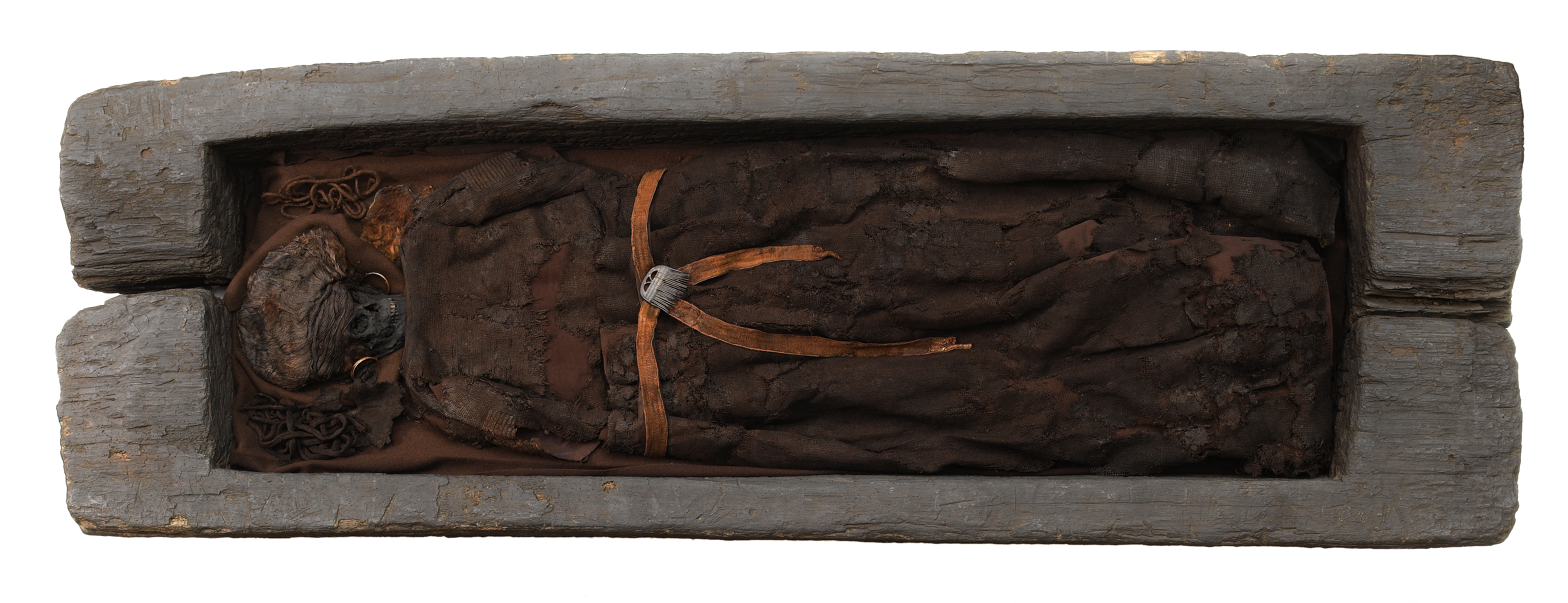
Skrydstrup Woman, mummified remains in oak coffin, Denmark, c. 1300 BC

Fragments of soft tissue were also preserved, including parts of the cheeks, eyebrows, eyelids and eyelashes. Her approximately 60-centimetre (24 in) hair survived intact, although prolonged exposure to moisture, acidity and the anoxic burial environment caused its original pigment to fade, leaving predominantly yellow and red tones, which are the most stable under these conditions.

Her teeth were exceptionally well preserved and showed no evidence of dental caries, suggesting that her diet was low in refined carbohydrates and sugars. The survival of intact hair and teeth made it possible to carry out detailed isotope and trace element analyses that contributed to reconstructions of her health, diet and residential history.

Organic materials associated with the burial were also exceptionally well preserved. Her wool clothing survived well enough for its weaving and construction techniques to be identified, while the horsehair hairnet retained much of its original structure. Together, these finds provide evidence for Bronze Age textile production, craftsmanship and dress.

== Clothing and grave goods ==
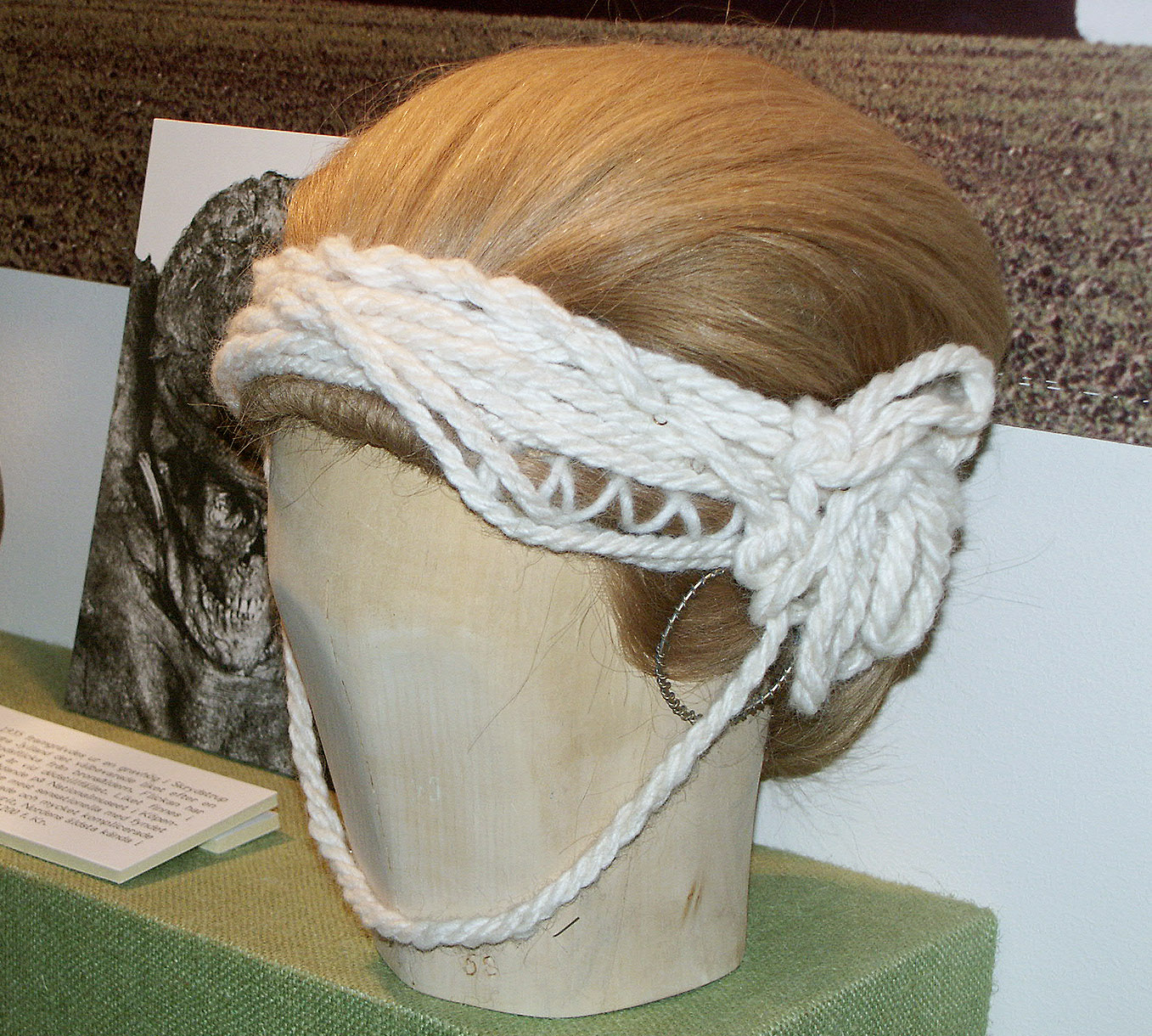
Reconstruction of hairstyle

The Skrydstrup Woman was laid on an ox-hide inside an oak log coffin wearing clothing made from the wool of a dark, reddish-brown sheep. She wore a short-sleeved woven wool blouse embroidered around the sleeves and neckline. A large square woollen cloth, gathered at the top by a belt, covered her from the waist to the feet. Attached to the belt was an ornate horn comb.

She was also buried with a woollen cap made using the sprang technique and a pair of large spiral gold rings that lay beside her ears. Her hair was enclosed within a fine hairnet made of unbraided horsehair, which was attached at the front and back to an almost 5 metres (16 ft)-long woollen cord. The cord was wrapped several times around her head like a headband, holding both the hairstyle and the hairnet securely in place.

== Scientific study ==
Osteologists identified the Skrydstrup Woman as a young woman who died in her late teens, around 18–19 years old. Her third molars had not yet erupted, and the proportions of her long bones match those of an adolescent who had reached her adult height. In life she stood about 171 centimetres (5 ft 7 in), which is noticeably taller than most women of the Nordic Bronze Age.

Radiocarbon dating places her death between 1382 and 1129 BCE, during the early part of the Nordic Bronze Age.

In 2015, researchers investigated where the Skrydstrup Woman had lived by analysing strontium isotopes preserved in one of her first molars and throughout the length of her hair.

The study concluded that she spent most of her childhood outside the Skrydstrup area before moving there at about 13 or 14 years of age. After her arrival, analysis of successive segments of her 60 centimetres (24 in) hair reconstructed the final 23 months of her life. The results suggested that she remained in the Skrydstrup area except for a journey lasting about six months before returning shortly before her death.

Two years later, in 2017, researchers refined this timeline by combining sequential strontium isotope measurements from her hair with high-precision radiocarbon dating. The study showed that the timing of her movements during the final months of her life could be reconstructed with near-monthly precision.

== Life and background ==
Archaeological work in the Skrydstrup area has helped place the Skrydstrup Woman within the local community of the early Nordic Bronze Age. A nearby farmstead, located about 700 metres (2,300 ft) northeast of the burial mound, dates to the same period as her interment and may have been her home.

Her clothing and ornaments offer further clues about her social background. The finely woven wool blouse, embroidered details, large square wool garment and horn comb reflect a level of craftsmanship associated with higher-status households. Her gold spiral earrings, made of high-purity metal, are rare finds in Nordic Bronze Age burials and indicate access to long-distance trade networks or elite craft specialists.

Taken together, the archaeological, textile and scientific evidence suggest that the Skrydstrup Woman was raised in a well-established farming community and likely belonged to a family of considerable standing in Bronze Age southern Jutland.

Professor Karin Frei from the National Museum of Denmark described her as an elegant, queen-like figure.

== See also ==
- Borum Eshøj
- Egtved Girl
- Haraldskær Woman
- List of unsolved deaths
- Mummy
- Tollund Man

== Bibliography ==
- Broholm, H.C.; M Hald (1939). Skrydstrupfundet. København: Nordisk Forlag.
- Broholm, H.C.; M Hald (1940). Costumes of the Bronze Age in Denmark. Copenhagen and London.
- Aner, E.; K. Kersten (1984). Die Funde der älteren Bronzezeit des nordischen Kreises in Danemark, Schleswig-Holstein und Niedersachsen, Nordslesvig – Nord, Haderslev Amt. Vol. 7. Neumünster: Wachholtz Verlag.
- Jensen, J. (1998). Manden i Kisten. Hvad bronzealderens gravhøje gemte. Gyldendal.
- Kaul, F. (1998). Ships on Bronzes: A Study in Bronze Age Religion and Iconography. Vol. 3. Copenhagen: National Museum of Denmark.
- Ethelberg, P. (2000). Bronzealderen. In Det sønderjyske landbrugs historie. Sten- og Bronzealder. Haderslev: Historiske Samfund for Sønderjylland.
- Jensen, J. (2002). Bronzealder 2.000-500 f.Kr. Vol. 2. København: Gylndendalske Boghandel.
- Kaul, F. (2004). Bronzealderens religion: studier af den nordsike bronzealders ikonografi. Det Kongelige Nordsike Oldskriftselskab.
- Frei, Karin Margarita; et al. (2015). "Tracing the dynamic life story of a Bronze Age Female". Scientific Reports. 5 10431. Bibcode:2015NatSR...510431M. doi:10.1038/srep10431. PMC 4440039. PMID 25994525. 10431.
- Frei, Karin Margarita; et al. (2017). "A matter of months: High precision migration chronology of a Bronze Age female". PLOS ONE. 12 (6) e0178834. Bibcode:2017PLoSO..1278834F. doi:10.1371/journal.pone.0178834. PMC 5459461. PMID 28582402. e0178834.
- Knipper, Corina; et al. (2017). "Female exogamy and gene pool diversification at the transition from the Final Neolithic to the Early Bronze Age in central Europe". Proceedings of the National Academy of Sciences. 114 (38): 10083–10088. Bibcode:2017PNAS..11410083K. doi:10.1073/pnas.1706355114. PMC 5617280. PMID 28874531.
- Reiter, Samantha S.; Frein, Karin M. Frei (2019). "Interpreting Past Human Mobility Patterns: A Model". European Journal of Archaeology. 22 (4): 454–469. doi:10.1017/eaa.2019.35. S2CID 198644355.
- Thomsen, Erik; Andreasen, Rasmus (2019). "Agricultural lime disturbs natural strontium isotope variations: Implications for provenance and migration studies". Science Advances. 5 (3) eaav8083. Bibcode:2019SciA....5.8083T. doi:10.1126/sciadv.aav8083. PMC 6415960. PMID 30891501. eaav808.
- Frei, R.; Frei, K. M.; Jessen, S. (2020). "Shallow retardation of the strontium isotope signal of agricultural liming - implications for isoscapes used in provenance studies". Science of the Total Environment. 706 135710. Bibcode:2020ScTEn.70635710F. doi:10.1016/j.scitotenv.2019.135710. hdl:109.1.5/0df5280e-5473-4ab1-b071-8708a9d7c61d. PMID 31787292. S2CID 208535341. 135710.
- Frei, R.; Frank, Anja B.; Frei, Karin M. (2022). "The proper choice of proxies for relevant strontium isotope baselines used for provenance and mobility studies in glaciated terranes – Important messages from Denmark". Science of the Total Environment. 821 153394. Bibcode:2022ScTEn.82153394F. doi:10.1016/j.scitotenv.2022.153394. hdl:109.1.5/fc6e2604-0ec3-43e6-baab-0f6554336095. PMID 35093367. S2CID 246418942.
- Price, T. Douglas (2021). "Problems with strontium isotopic proveniencing in Denmark?". Danish Journal of Archaeology. 10: 1–12. doi:10.7146/dja.v10i0.121659. S2CID 240305680.
