= Horsehair =

Long, coarse hair growing on the manes and tails of horses

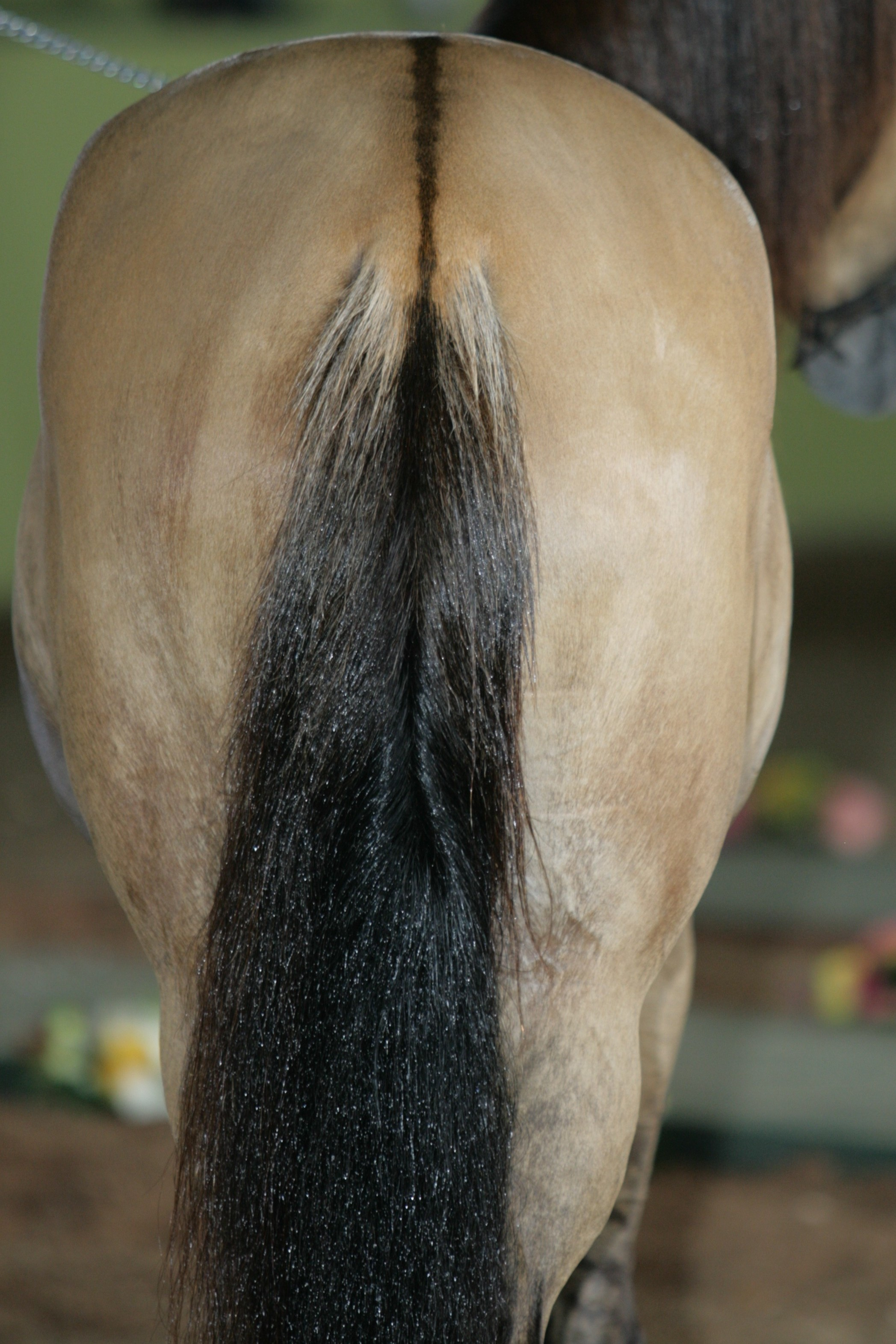
A horse's tail

Horsehair is the long hair growing on the manes and tails of horses. It is used for various purposes, including: upholstery, brushes, the bows of musical instruments, a hard-wearing fabric called haircloth, and for horsehair plaster- a wallcovering material formerly used in the construction industry and now found only in older buildings.

The texture of horse hair varies across the horse's body; mane hair is generally softer and shorter than rougher and longer tail hair. The texture of horsehair can be influenced by the breed and management of the horse, including natural conditions such as diet or climate. Processing may also affect quality and feel.

Horsehair is a protein fiber that absorbs water slowly, but can be dyed or colored effectively using traditional dyes suitable for protein fibers. It can be felted, but not easily.

== Uses ==
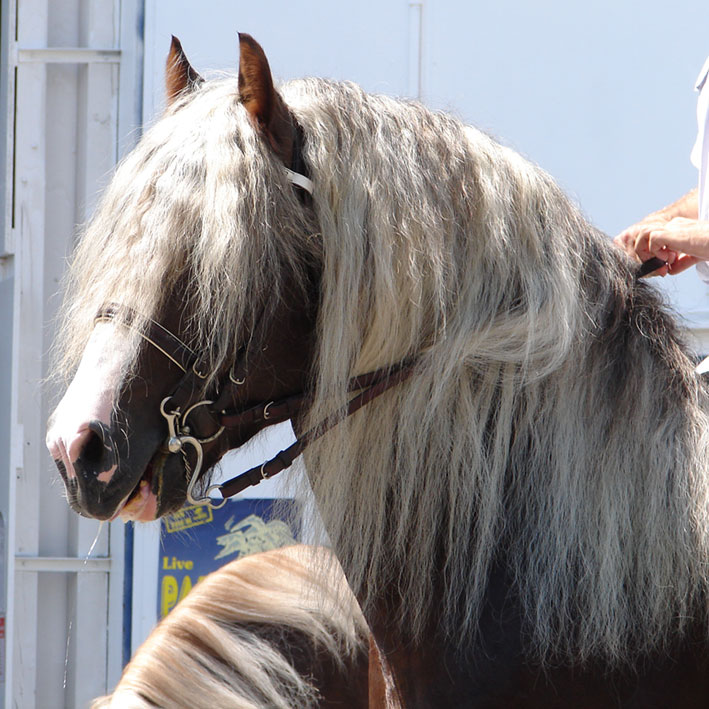
Mane hair is shorter and softer than tail hair.

Horsehair fabrics are woven with wefts of tail hair from live horses and cotton or silk warps. Horsehair fabrics are sought for their lustre, durability and care properties, and are mainly used for upholstery and interiors.

Horsehair is used for the crafts of horsehair hitching, horsehair braiding, pottery, and in making jewelry items such as bracelets, necklaces, earrings and barrettes. It is used to make some wall and fine arts paintbrushes. Horsehair for painting and for hat brushes are two of the areas where horsehair is still widely used today. The hair is processed, cut to size and fitted to paint brushes. Horsehair is desirable for paint brushes because of its smooth lay and ability to hold a large amount of paint, acting as a reservoir, helping with smoother, faster workflow.

Horsehair is used for violin and other stringed instrument bows. Another use in the art community comes from pottery and basket weaving, where the hair is used for distinct accents and styling.

The use of horsehair for fishing has a wide range of applications. The most widely applied use for horsehair is in the fishing line. The hair is spun together and made into very long lines. Another historic use was for gloves commonly used for fishing in the medieval age leading up to the 17th century in cold climates. In the early 1900s, surgeons would use horsehair and silver wires to suture the incisions needed for a facelift.

Horsehair has been used in more modern times as the constituent of expensive horsehair mattresses.

== Supply ==
Most horsehair comes from slaughtered horses. Hair for bows comes from tails of horses in cold climates, and is sorted by size. It comes primarily from stallions and costs $150–$400 per pound because of the sorting needed to extract long hairs. Mongolia produces 900 tons of horsehair per year.

== History ==
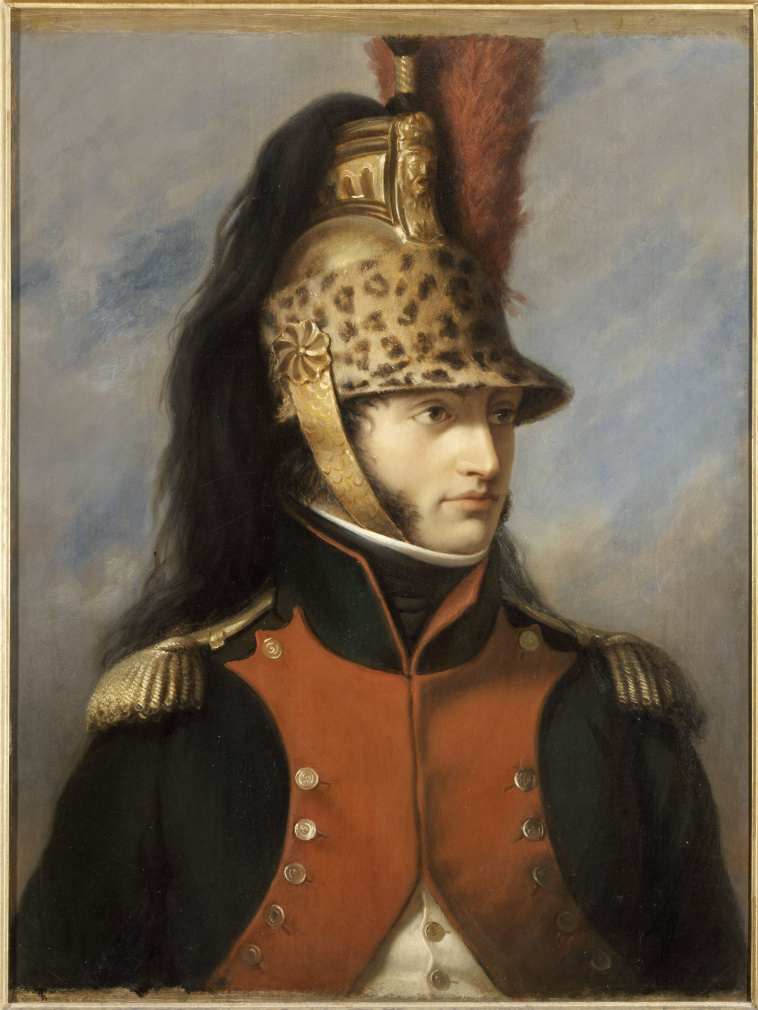
Louis Bonaparte wearing a dragoon helmet with mane

There has been some speculation as to the first use of horsehair. Many sources indicate the Spaniards in the 8th century were the first to use horsehair as a textile. However, the first documented use was from the 9th century in Switzerland where the Swiss used it for the plans of St. Gall Abbey. The plans, a blueprint for a monastic compound in medieval times, are a national preserved treasure to the Swiss that were said to have been woven with horsehair.

It was commonly used in the 19th century as upholstery stuffing (such as for fabric sofas) and as covering fabric for furniture. It was almost always the fiber used to make shaving brushes. It was also common in hats and women's undergarments. It was used in the hair to create the "Gibson Girl" look, and in the 18th century it was used in wigs. Until the 20th century, it was commonly used to make fine arts paintbrushes, along with sable, fox, wolf, goat, and lamb hair. Calligraphy brushes are made from rabbit, fox, or horse hair, among others. For thousands of years, fishing lines were made of plaited horsehair.

== Other applications ==
In modern times, mane and tail horsehair samples with root tissue attached are commonly used for DNA analysis of equine specimens. Private genetic testing companies regularly use the DNA extracted from the root follicle of horsehair for relationship testing, genetic disease assays and determining coat color genetics.

== See also ==
- Horsehair bed
- Camel hair
- Mohair – Goat hair
