= Chiengora =

Yarn or wool spun from dog hair

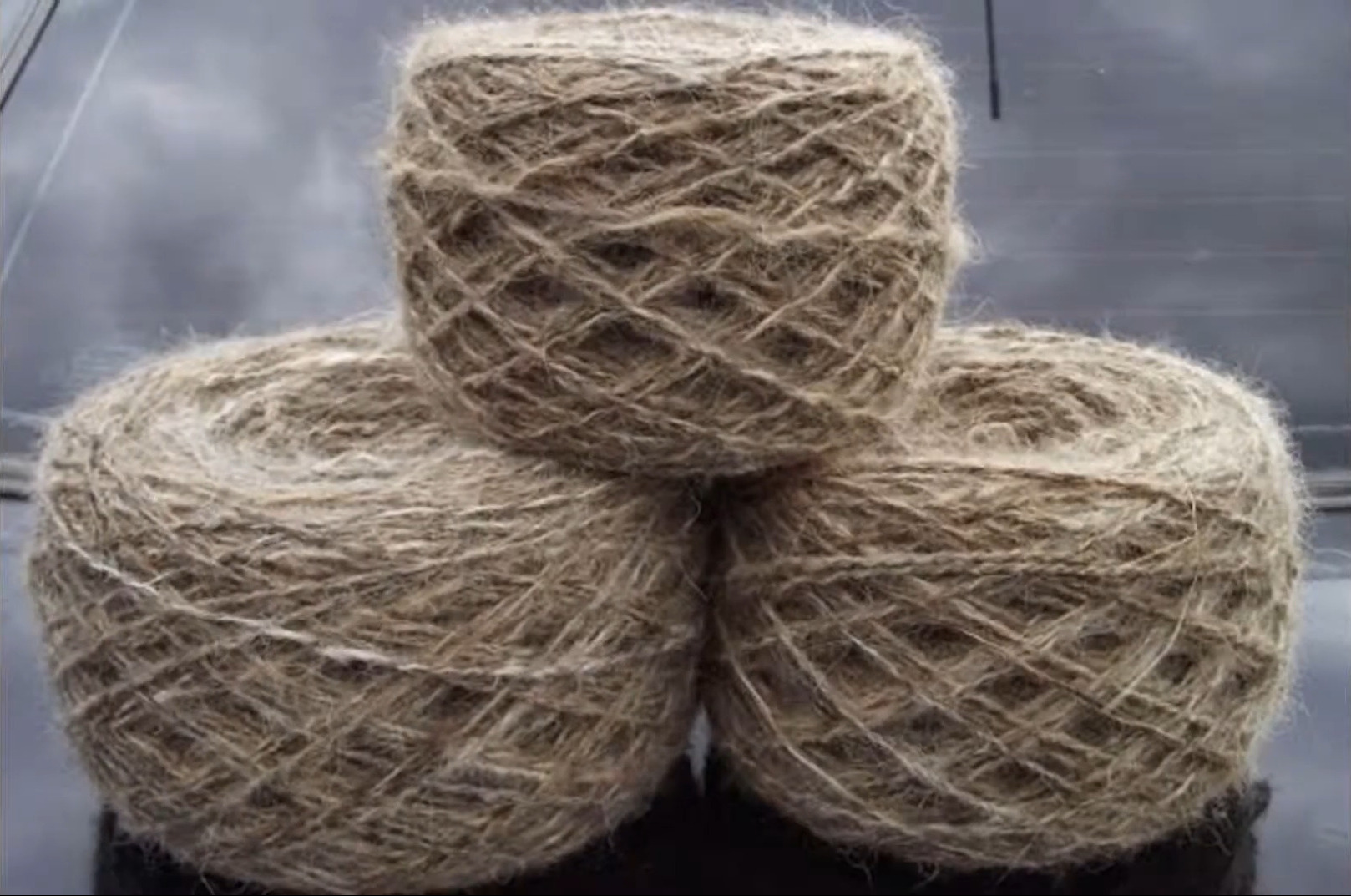
Handspun chiengora yarn

Chiengora, also called "dog wool", is yarn or wool spun from dog hair. The word is a portmanteau of chien (the French word for dog) and angora and was coined by an American spinner, Annette Klick. Dog hair is up to 80% warmer than wool and is not elastic.

== History ==
Spinning dog hair is not a new art form. Dog hair has been found in yarns dating back from pre-historic Scandinavia, and in textiles from the Navajo and Northwest Coast Native Americans of North America. It was the main fiber spun on the Northern American continent before the Spaniards introduced sheep. Sometimes dog hair is blended with wool during the carding process to make yarn. This blend has some give to it, which is preferable when knitting. It may also be blended with sheep wool in order to create a yarn with less heat insulation.

The best hairs for this application are from 'Northern' breeds with a soft undercoat, such as Newfoundlands, Chow Chows, Samoyed, Norwegian Elkhounds, and the like.

While not as common as the use of wool and other animal fibers, chiengora has a long history of use by hand spinners as well as small businesses who produce it for sale. It has been called by many descriptive names over the decades. In a 1983 article, Annette Klick noted that when selling her doghair products, some people would be disgusted if told an item was made of dog hair, but would admire finished mittens that looked like they were made of angora (rabbit). Consequently, Klick and her daughter created the word Chiengora and from then on Klick noted "we got a much heartier response." While it is difficult to trace the earlier history of small businesses spinning chiengora and selling chiengora products, there continue to be many businesses advertising their chiengora online. Some spinners primarily work on custom projects, such as spinning dog hair provided by customers from their own dogs, while others collect chiengora from many dogs, spin, and then sell the yarns for others to use.

Chiengora has been the subject of several studies including a 2003 thesis for a Master of Science degree in the Department of Textile Apparel Technology & Management at the North Carolina State University. In this study, J. Suzanne Greer states that the objectives of their research are "1) to determine the properties of dog hair, and 2) to pinpoint which dog hair, or chiengora, fibers should be considered possible candidates for commercially producing yarns and/or fabrics." She clarifies that "Chiengora is the name being used for yarn spun from dog hair. Chien is French for dog and gora is from angora, the fiber that dog hair most closely resembles. [...] Chiengora is now considered a luxury fiber along with mohair, cashmere (goat hair), and angora (rabbit hair)." It was later the subject of a paper from the Department of Fashion Technology at the PSG College of Technology in India titled "Analysis of physical and thermal properties of chiengora fibers". It has also been the topic for a series of articles published in the Journal of Natural Fibers from 2018 to 2021.

Although chiengora had been spun for decades, an increase in interest in hand-spinning and the use of alternative fibers for textiles led to increased attention to this fiber source in the 2010s. Even the American Kennel Club adopted discussion of chiengora and asserted, in 2018, that "The official term for dog-fur yarn is 'chiengora'."

Starting in 2017 a German company, Yarnsustain GmbH (founded in 2020) in conjunction with Modus Intarsia attempted to register a trademark on Chiengora in various countries. Their applications have been refused or denied in the EU, UK, Australia, and US so far. It was approved in Germany.

== See also ==
- Salish Wool Dog
