= Yak fiber =

Fiber wool produced from the coat hair of yaks

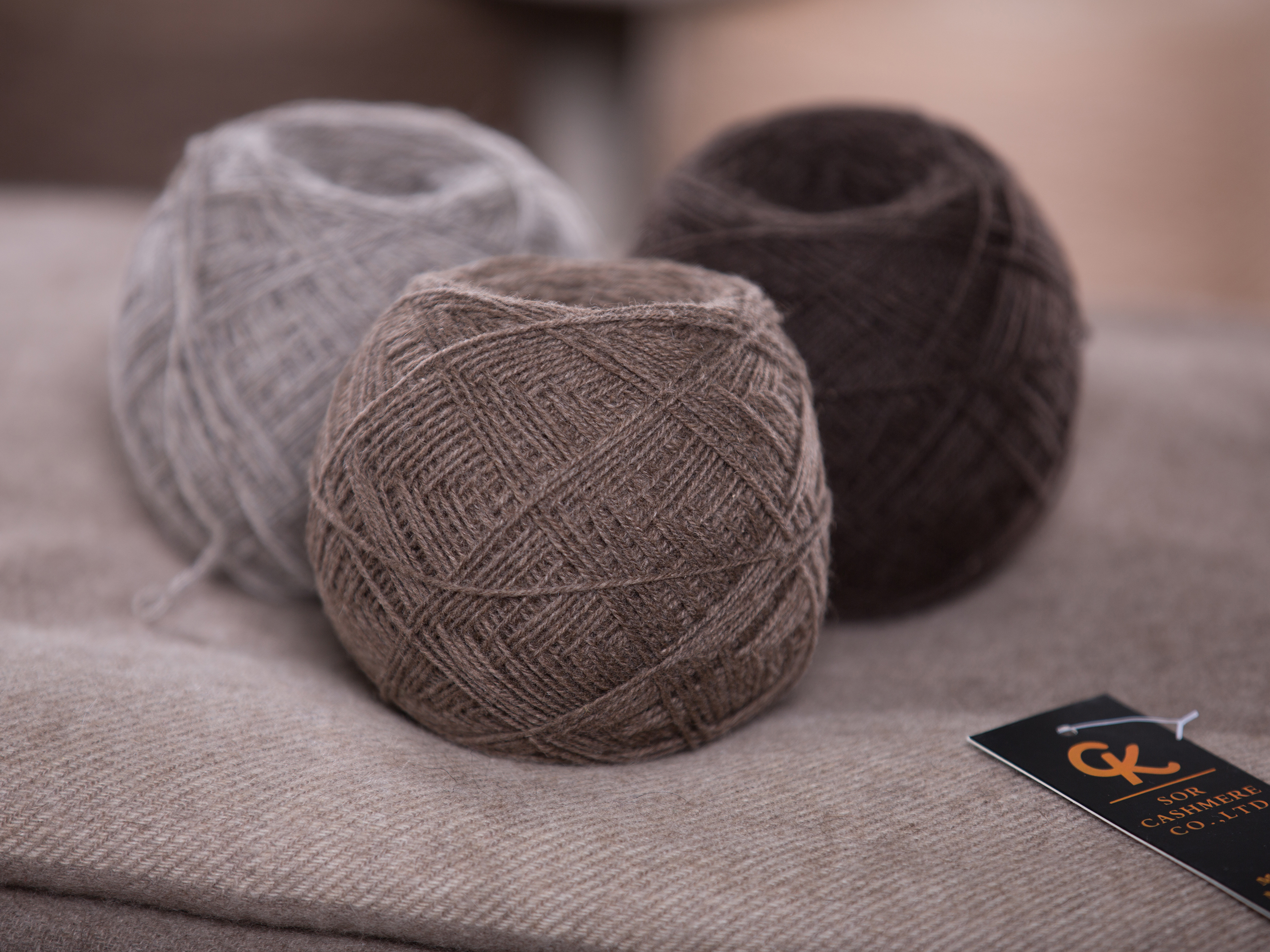
Yak wool yarn

Yak fiber is the term commonly used to refer yak fiber wool produced from the coat hair of yaks (Bos grunniens), a long-haired bovine mainly found in the Himalayan region, Tibetan plateau, and some areas of Mongolia and Central Asia.

Yak fiber wool has been used by nomads in the Trans-Himalayan region for over a thousand years to make clothing, tents, ropes and blankets.

== Types ==
The coat hair of the yak is composed of three different types of fiber that vary greatly in appearance and characteristics. The quantity of fiber produced by one yak is dependent on factors such as sex, age and breed of the yak, and the proportions of the different layers vary throughout the different seasons.

- The coarse: Mostly used by nomads in tent making, this fiber has a size range of 79–90 microns forming the outer coat of long hair that characterizes the appearance of the yak.
- The mid-type: With a diameter size between 20–50 microns, this fiber is naturally strong but not stronger than the outer layers to make ropes and tents and not as fine as the down fiber for the textile industry.
- The down fiber: This is the finest fiber (16–20 microns) and is generally shed by the animal during late spring/early summer period. Therefore, this fine layer needs to be harvested before it is shed in the summer season. Down fiber, and fewer sweat glands, are two examples of how yaks have adapted to survive extreme cold temperatures (sometimes as low as −50 °C, or −58 °F) and altitudes well above 3000 m.

== Properties ==
Yak wool has similar properties to other animal fibers, including breathability and static-resistance, but has been proven to outperform sheep wool in a number of areas.

Warmth: In woollen garments, air pockets are created between the fibers that reduce the rate of heat transfer. This property combined with lanolin (a hydrophobic grease present in wool fibers) allowing wool to keep you warm when wet. Yak wool is rich in myristic acid, a type of hydrophobic fatty acid. Independently conducted tests on yak down suggest that it is warmer than Merino wool. Nonetheless, claims vary on how much warmer it is with values ranging between 10 and 40 percent.

Softness: Cashmere is known in the textile industry as one of the softest wools with a fiber diameter of less than 18.5. The diameter of the down fiber of the yak also ranges 16–20 microns making its softness comparable to that of cashmere. Species-specific DNA probes have been developed to identify yak, which is used to quantitatively test yak-cashmere blends. Although cashmere has already been firmly established in the market, yak wool has potential to be sold as a luxury product due to its softness and the (currently) sustainable and eco-friendly means used for gathering the fibers.

Breathability: In general, wool's comfort comes from its thermo-balance characteristics. The breathability factor of a material depends on its ability to absorb moisture relative to its weight and then release it into the air. The higher the absorption value the better the textile is at adapting to humidity level changes. Wool can absorb over 30 per cent of moisture, greater than cotton (25 per cent) and far greater than polyester which can absorb only 1 per cent of its weight.

Odor-resistance: Contrary to popular belief, yaks do not have a strong odor. Unless combined with the bacteria that live on the skin, sweat is odorless. The anti-microbial properties of yak fibers prevent bacteria from living on sweat thereby considerably reducing odor.

== Uses ==
=== Traditional ===
The coarse outer fibers have been traditionally used by nomads to make ropes and tents. In earlier times, the coarse hair was mixed with down hair to make the weaving denser. However, the current increasing demand for the down fiber from the international market means that the fine fiber is mostly sold. The rarity of the white hair implicates that ropes made out of white and black yarn is admired for its appearance and uniqueness. In west Sichuan, China, 34 per cent of the animal fiber comes from yak hair alone. In Bhutan, the long hair is used for weaving tents, bags, rugs and slings, whereas in Mongolia it is used for clothing, tents and bags. To obtain the optimal length, nomads comb the hair and then spin it into yarn. During this process, the loom determines the width of the tent squares and the length of the tent. The tent squares are then sewn tightly together by men.

=== Architecture ===
Although uncommon, yak wool has also been employed as sound proof material by the Dutch artist Claudy Jongstra in the refurbishment of Rem Koolhaas' Kunsthal in Rotterdam, a building that gets 300,000 visitors a year. She made a thick, dense yak hair felt with a graphic design of white lines.
