= Qiviut =

Soft inner wool of the muskox

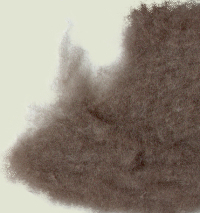
A small piece of qiviut wool

Qiviuq [sg] or qiviut [pl] (/ˈkɪviət/ KIV-ee-ət; Inuktitut syllabics: ᕿᕕᐅᖅ; Inuinnaqtun: qiviuq; Inupiaq: qiviu or qiviuq (sometimes spelled qiveut)) is the inner wool of the muskox. In Inuinnaqtun the same word can be used to refer any down such as the down feathers of birds.

The muskox has a two-layered coat, and qiviut refers specifically to the soft underwool beneath the longer outer wool. The muskox sheds this layer of wool each spring. Qiviut is plucked from the coat of the muskox during the moult or gathered from objects the animals have brushed against; unlike sheep, the animals are not sheared. Much of the commercially available qiviut comes from Canada, and is obtained from the pelts of muskoxen after hunts. In Alaska, qiviut is obtained from farmed animals or gathered from the wild during the molt.

== Properties ==
Qiviut is stronger and warmer than sheep's wool, and softer than cashmere wool. Wild muskoxen have qiviut fibres approximately 18 micrometres (0.018 mm; 0.00071 in) in diameter. Females and young animals have slightly finer wool. Unlike sheep's wool, it does not shrink in water at any temperature, but this means that it also is not useful for felting.

It is most commonly used for hats and scarves, and is among the softest as well as warmest wools. It is very expensive; a high quality knitted scarf can cost more than $300 U.S., but will last over 20 years with good care.

== Production and processing ==
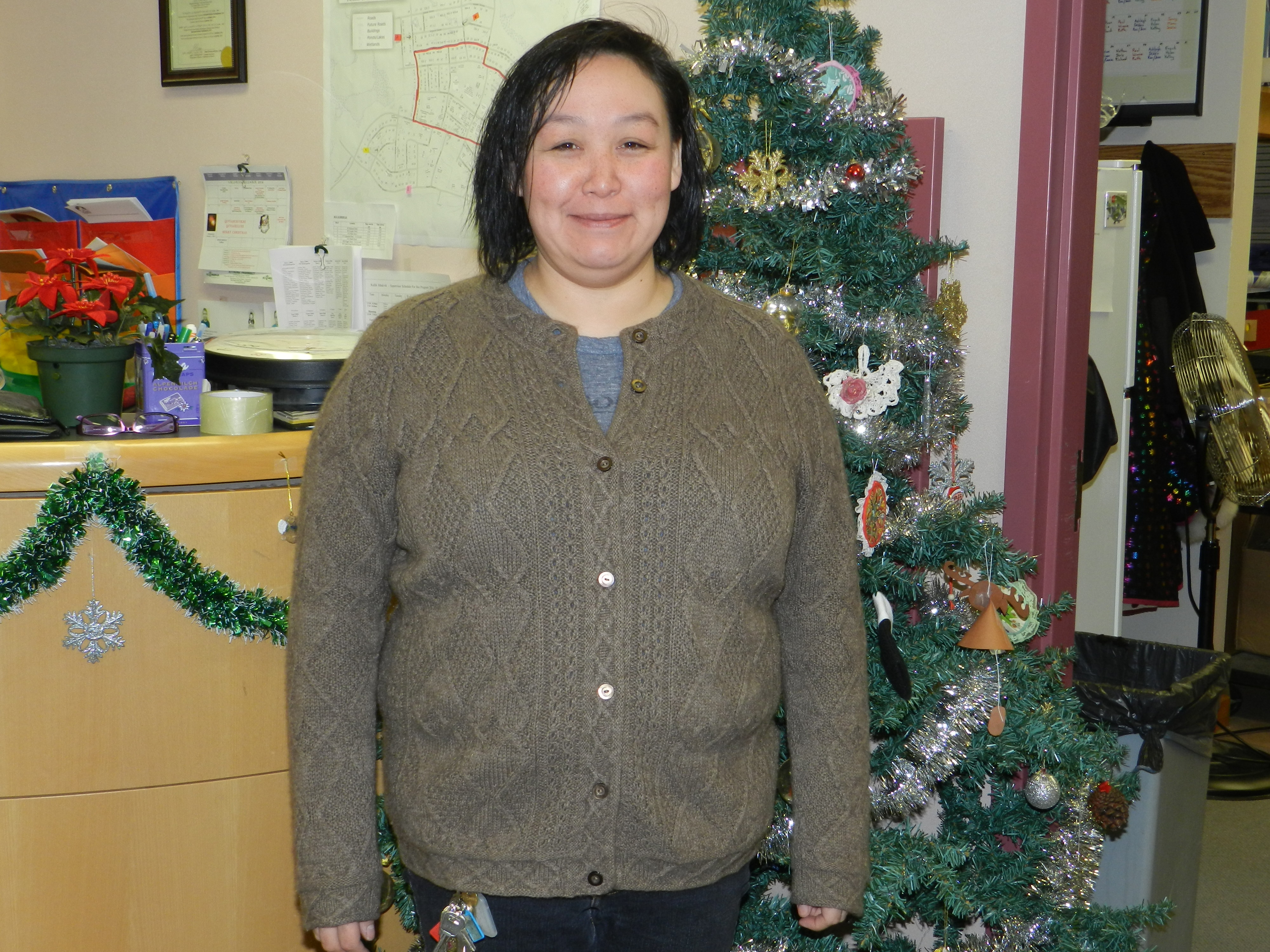
Qiviut sweater worth about Can$900 in 2014

An adult muskox can produce 1.8 to 3.2 kg (4 to 7 lb) of qiviut a year. Qiviut is produced by the muskox's secondary hair follicles, which are not associated with sebaceous glands, and therefore is a much drier fibre than wool, having only about 7 percent oils. The hair follicle density is very high (approximately 42 mm^{2} [0.065 sq in]) and qiviut is shed in a tightly synchronized spring moulting period. The qiviut will loosen from the animal's skin and pull away slightly, creating a "spectacled" look around the eyes and becoming visible all over the body at the surface of the pelt. At this stage of the moult, the undercoat is a short but relatively uniform distance from the skin. This lends itself to combing the qiviut from the animal in a single large sheet. If not combed, the qiviut will begin to fall out in clumps or be rubbed off by the animal, and may be plucked off the ground or bushes, but qiviut collected this way is of lower quality and requires more cleaning.

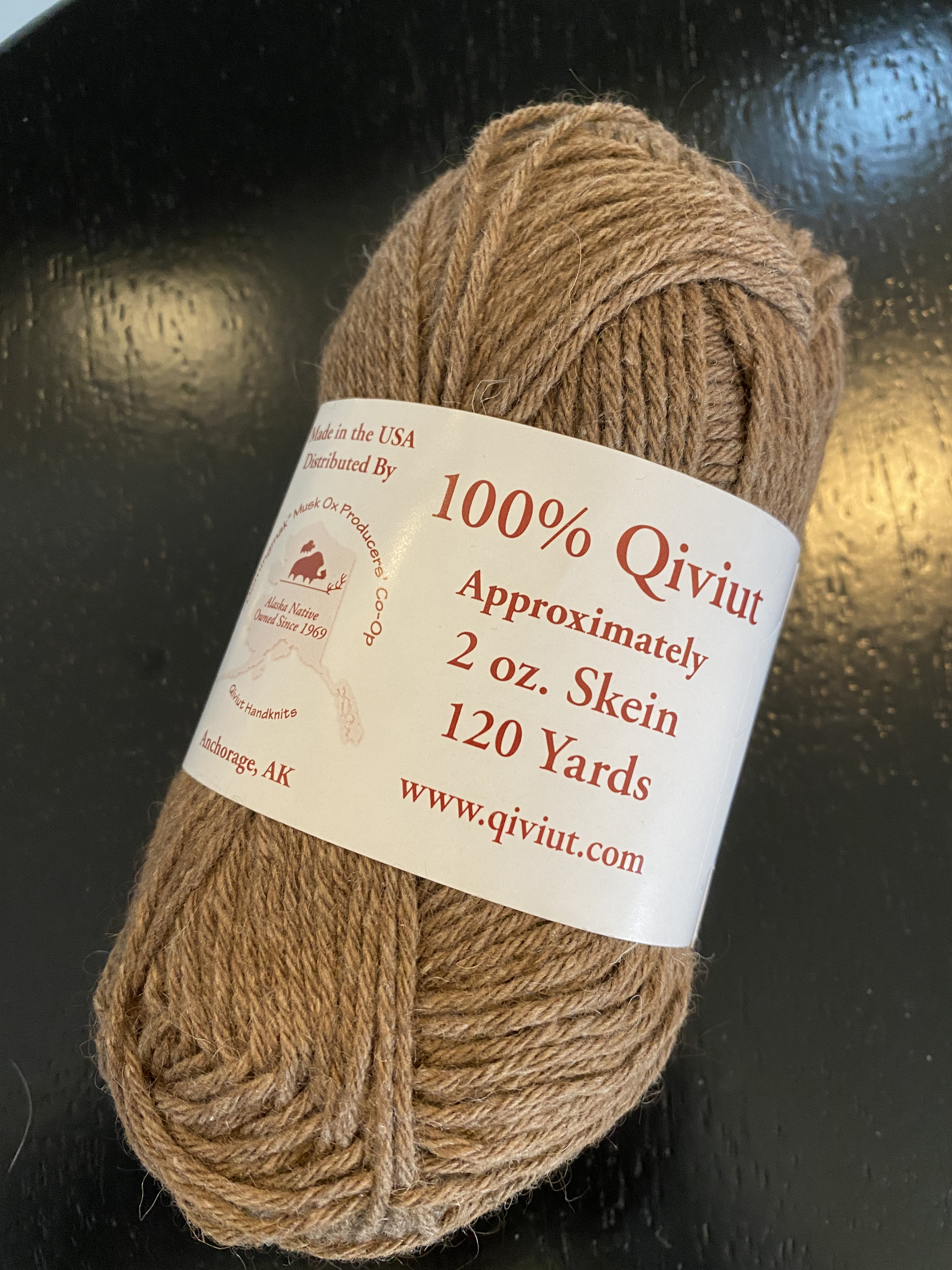
Skein of qiviut yarn in worsted

At the Robert G. White Large Animal Research Station (LARS), a modified bison crush is used to gently but firmly hold the muskoxen in place, and the pelt combed out using a long-toothed comb or hair pick. After the fleece is removed, it is cleaned by hand, removing vegetation and other foreign matter, and then dehaired. Dehairing is the removal of intermediate hairs (greater than 30 μm (0.030 mm; 0.0012 in) in diameter). Dehairing is accomplished by carding as one would cashmere. Mechanical carding can cause breakage and weaken and roughen the qiviut. Because the pelt is combed rather than shaved, very few guard hairs come out with the qiviut using this method. Pelts from hunted animals are shaved, so the dehairing process in this case is more laborious. After dehairing, the qiviut may be cleaned again, if necessary.

The raw, cleaned qiviut is spun and then the yarn is washed. Natural qiviut is soft greyish brown in color, but it takes dye well and can be found for sale in myriad colors. Bleaching weakens the fibre, however, so many spinners and knitters recommend using only overdyed natural qiviut, which has darker, more subdued colours.

Muskoxen were hunted to extinction in Alaska by the end of the 1800s and reintroduced in 1935. Yarn production was first done soon after the reintroduction by an Alaskan home economics teacher who gathered the fibre and spun it herself.

Muskoxen were not domesticated until 1954. Domestication began with the Musk Ox Project, headed by John J. Teal, Jr with the first domestic muskox farm in Fairbanks, Alaska. The project continues at the muskox farm in Palmer, Alaska. The Oomingmak Musk Ox Producer's Cooperative was formed in the late 1960s by indigenous women on Nunivak Island, with the help of Dr. Teal and Mrs. L. Schell. It is a knitting cooperative that works with qiviut and is still in operation today. The cooperative has its headquarters in Anchorage, Alaska, and is owned by approximately 200 native Alaskans from many remote villages in Alaska. The name of the cooperative comes from the Inuit language word for muskox, umingmak, "the animal with skin like a beard."

As of 2016 there were about four thousand muskox in Alaska and raw qiviut fibre was sold at $1.2 per gram ($35/oz), approximately twice the price of cashmere. A scarf knitted from qiviut cost $275 at the Oomingmak collective.
