= Angora wool =

Fur of the angora rabbit, used as a textile fiber

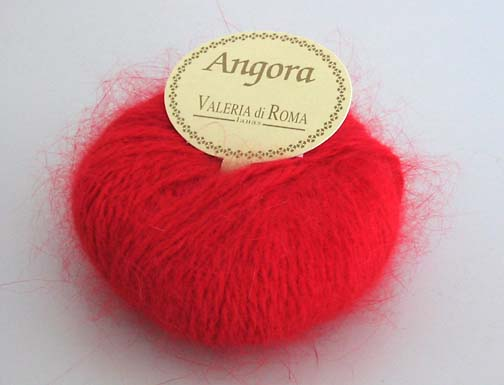
Angora wool, showing the "halo" effect

Angora hair or Angora fibre is the downy coat produced by the Angora rabbit. While the names of the source animals are similar, Angora fibre is distinct from mohair, which comes from the Angora goat. The cloth produced has sometimes been named Angola fabric. Angora fibre is also distinct from cashmere, which comes from the cashmere goat. Angora is known for its softness, thin fibres, and what knitters refer to as a halo (fluffiness). It is also known for its silky texture. It is much warmer and lighter than wool due to the hollow core of the angora fibre. It also gives the wool its characteristic floating feel.

Angora rabbits produce coats in a variety of colours, from white through tan, grey, and brown to black. Good quality Angora fibre is around 12–16 micrometres in diameter, and can cost as much as US$0.35–$0.56 per gram ($10–$16/oz). It felts very easily, even on the animal itself if it is not groomed frequently.

Yarns of 100% angora are typically used as accents. They have the most halo and warmth, but can felt very easily through abrasion and humidity and can be excessively warm in a finished garment. The fibre is normally blended with wool to give the yarn elasticity, as Angora fibre is not naturally elastic. The blend decreases the softness and halo as well as the price of the finished object. Commercial knitting yarns typically use 30–50% angora, in order to produce some halo, warmth, and softness without the side effects of excessive felting.

== Angora rabbit ==
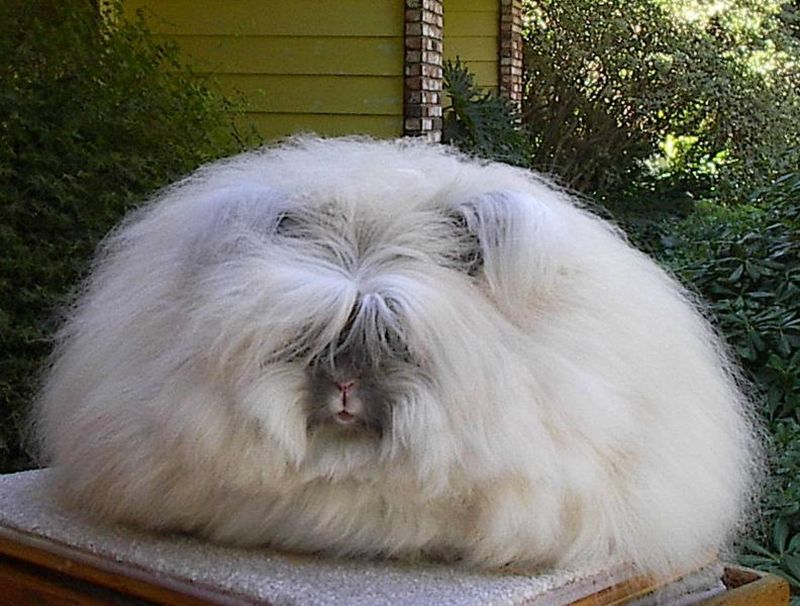
An Angora rabbit

There are four different types of Angora recognized by the American Rabbit Breeders' Association: English, French, Satin, and Giant. There are many other breeds, one of the more common being German. Each breed produces different quality and quantity of fibre, and has a different range of colours.

== Fur production ==
90% of Angora fur is produced in China, although Europe, Chile and the United States also produce small quantities. In China, there are more than 50 million Angora rabbits, growing 2,500–3,000 tonnes (2,800–3,300 short tons) per year. Harvesting occurs up to three times a year (about every 4 months) and is collected by plucking or shearing of the moulting fur.

Most breeds of Angora rabbits moult with their natural growth cycle about every four months. Many producers of the fibre pluck the fur of these breeds. Plucking is, in effect, pulling out the moulted fur. Plucking ensures a minimum of guard hair, and the fur is not as matted when plucked as when it is collected from the rabbit's cage. However, plucking a rabbit is time-consuming, so some producers shear the rabbit instead. While this results in slightly lower quality fleece, as the guard hairs are included, it does take less time and results in more fleece. Also, not all breeds of Angora moult, and if the rabbit does not naturally moult, it cannot be plucked. German Angoras do not moult.

The rabbits must be groomed at least once or twice a week to prevent the fur from matting and felting. There is also a danger a rabbit will ingest its own moulted fur; unlike a cat, a rabbit cannot easily be rid of the build up.

== Animal cruelty involved in wool production ==
The animal rights organisation People for the Ethical Treatment of Animals argues that Angora wool comes from rabbits that suffer horrific abuse, especially on farms in China, which supplies 90% of the world's angora. A PETA Asia investigation reported that rabbits scream in pain as their fur is violently ripped out every three months, leaving them shocked and motionless in filthy cages. Rabbits that are sheared are tightly restrained and often wounded as they struggle in terror. With no legal protections, the rabbits endure raw, inflamed feet, eye infections, and extreme psychological distress. Many die within two years. After two to five years, surviving rabbits are slaughtered for meat. Males not used for breeding are killed at birth.

In 2013, several clothing retailers suspended the sourcing of products containing Angora wool after video evidence surfaced of live rabbits with their paws tied being plucked raw in Chinese fur farms. Major retailers that banned Angora products in response to welfare concerns include Hugo Boss, Gap Inc., Calvin Klein, Tommy Hilfiger, H&M and Esprit.

In September 2016, French animal rights charity One Voice released disturbing footage from six Angora rabbit farms across France. The videos depict the animals being pinned down with their front and hind legs spread apart while workers pluck and rip the fur from their skin. In the video, the rabbits seem to vocalize pain, with the process leaving them completely bare except for their heads.

== Quality of wool ==
The premium first quality wool is taken from the back and upper sides of the rabbit. This is usually the longest and cleanest fibre on the rabbit. There should not be hay or vegetable matter in the fibre. Second quality is from the neck and lower sides, and may have some vegetable matter. Third quality is the buttocks and legs and any other areas that easily felt and are of shorter length. Fourth quality is totally unsalvageable, and consists of the larger felted bits or stained fibre. Third and fourth quality are perfect for cutting up for birds to use in lining their nests. With daily brushing, felting of the fibre can be avoided, increasing the usable portion of fibre.

== Uses ==
Angora wool is commonly used in apparel such as sweaters and suitings, knitting yarn, and felting.

== See also ==
- Ed Wood, a filmmaker known for his love of Angora wool, to the extent of wearing it and featuring it prominently in his own films.
- International Year of Natural Fibres, a year promoting natural fibres, as observed by the United Nations in 2009.
- List of fabric names
- Mohair, a fabric made from the wool of the Angora Goat.
- Fur Farming
