= Berserk llama syndrome =

Aggressive behavior disorder in camelids

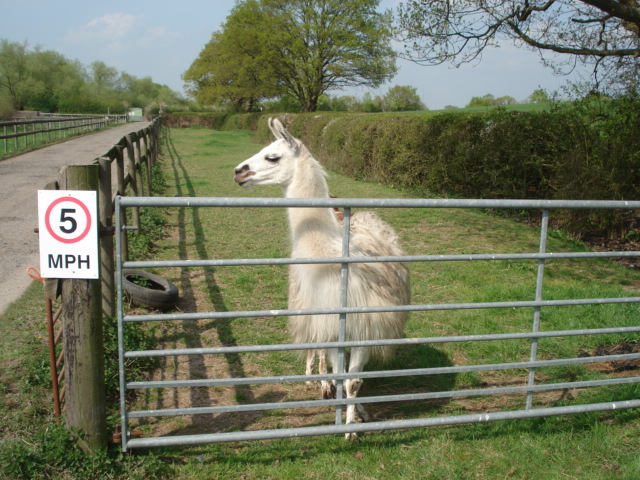
Isolated and domesticated llamas are more likely to have berserk llama syndrome.

Berserk llama syndrome (usually shortened to BLS), aberrant behavior syndrome, or berserk male syndrome (as it is more pronounced in males) is a psychological condition experienced by human-raised camelids, particularly llamas and alpacas, that can cause them to exhibit dangerously aggressive behavior toward humans. The term has been overused, however, and is sometimes inappropriately applied to llamas with aggressive personalities that are not truly "berserk".

== Causes ==
The condition was first observed and documented in the 1970s, upon the importation of llamas to the rural United States.

BLS is a result of overexposure of a juvenile llama, a cria, to humans, which results in the cria imprinting on its human handlers to such a degree that it considers them to be fellow llamas. Imprinting can be caused by bottle feeding, which is utilized due to a cria rejecting its mother's milk or when there is insufficient maternal milk supply. Another contributing factor is isolation from other llamas. When the cria reaches maturity, the llama cannot distinguish humans from other llamas and may try to demonstrate its dominance. Adult male inter-llama interaction can be rough, including chest-ramming, charging, leg-wrestling, and biting, and they are strongly territorial. In some severe cases, llamas with BLS may sneak up to their owners and attack them from behind. Male llamas with this condition become dangerous when this behavior is directed toward humans and are usually euthanised. Female llamas can also have berserk llama syndrome but their behavior is usually limited to spitting and difficult handling.

== Prevention and treatment ==
In males, the chance of developing berserk llama syndrome can be reduced through castration before puberty. However, BLS can still appear in gelded males. A majority of berserk males are euthanized.
