= CRIA =

CRIA or cria may refer to:

- Canadian Recording Industry Association, now Music Canada, a music industry association
- Cambridge Review of International Affairs, an academic journal on international relations
- Council on Religion and International Affairs, now the Carnegie Council for Ethics in International Affairs
- Cria, a juvenile llama, alpaca etc.
- Ciudad Real International Airport, the first and only private international airport in Spain, between Ciudad Real and Puertollano
- CRIA syndrome (Cleavage-resistant RIPK1-induced autoinflammatory syndrome), a medical disorder
