= Llama hiking =

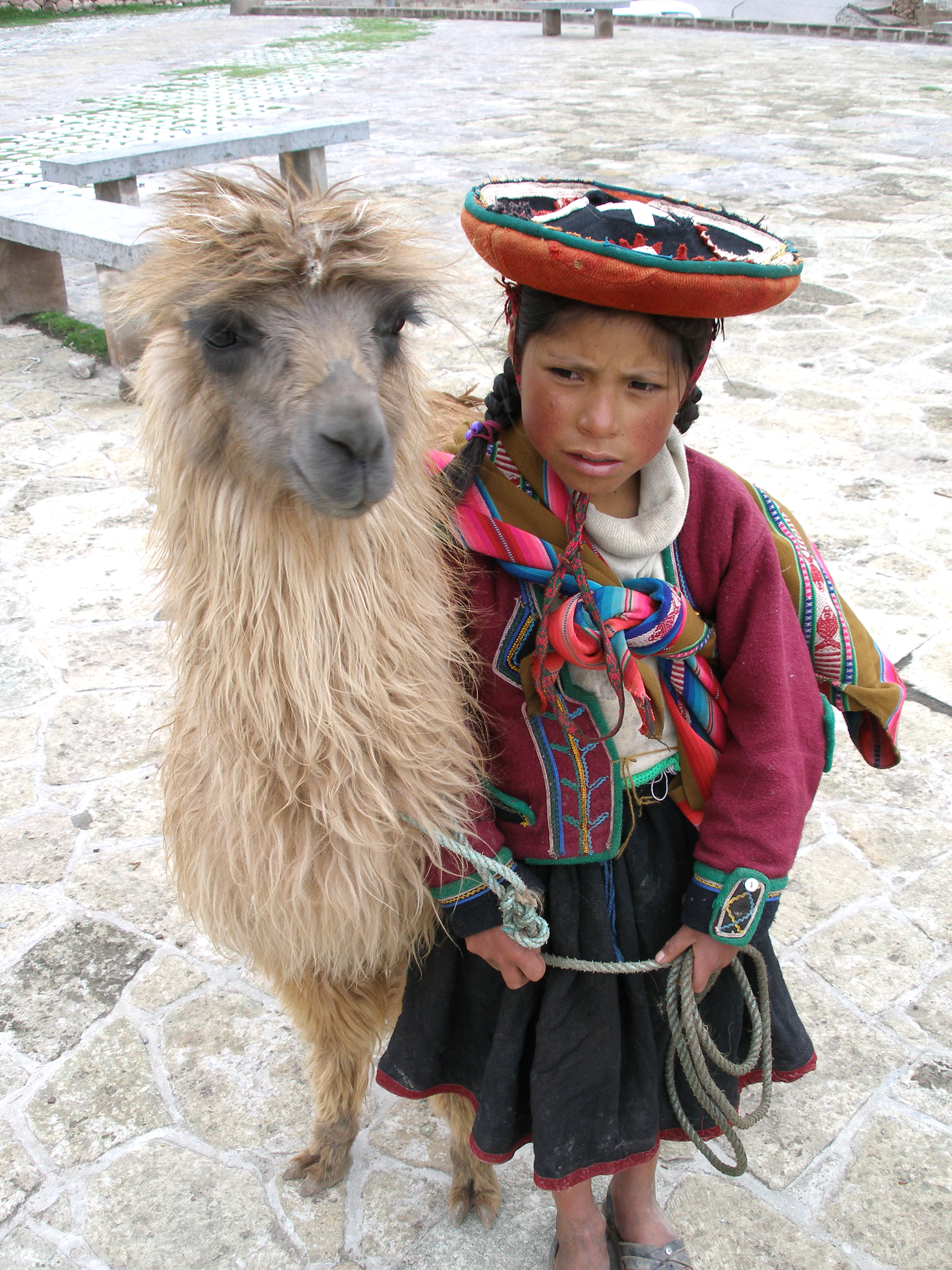
A Quechua child with a llama in Cuzco

Llama hiking, also known as llama trekking or llama caravanning, is an activity where llamas accompany people on hiking and walking trips, including eco-tourism. Expeditions can last from as little as a few hours to several days. For longer trips the llamas often carry up to three days trekking supplies or cargo in purpose-built pack saddles so the people with them can carry as little as a day backpack. Treks are also offered, accompanied by the closely related alpaca.

Llamas have padded feet similar to those of a dog, which lets them easily traverse steep and rocky paths while being more environmentally friendly to the ground than horse hooves. They also can use narrower paths reducing disturbances to vegetation. Llamas have both a thick undercoat and a woolly topcoat which protects them from the cold. A three-compartment stomach helps them cope with poor quality food sources. A llama can carry about 25% of its body weight with no problem. So an average animal of 300 pounds (136 kg) can carry around 75 pounds (34 kg) of equipment in its packs.

Llamas' excellent endurance combined with biddable and peaceful natures makes them suitable pack animals for hill walking, unlike more stubborn animals such as mules. People that might not usually participate in endurance walking go llama hiking, including couples looking for some romantic time together, or walking parties that include disabled children.

== History ==
Llamas have been used by people of the Andes Mountains as pack animals for hundreds of years. Recently, llama hiking has become popular in countries outside of South America. Since the second half of the 20th century large numbers of llamas have been brought across to the US and Canada. In southern California a few avocado farmers have used llamas to carry large loads of the fruit down steeper hills. In the UK, llamas can act as companions for a relaxing stroll, like walking a dog. Back in 1997, British newspaper The Independent described llama hiking as an exotic import from California, but it has since become more commonplace. In Wales during the 2020 COVID-19 pandemic, llamas previously used for llama hiking have been used to help deliver food and cheer up lonely people unable to get out due to the lockdown.

== Therapeutic walks ==
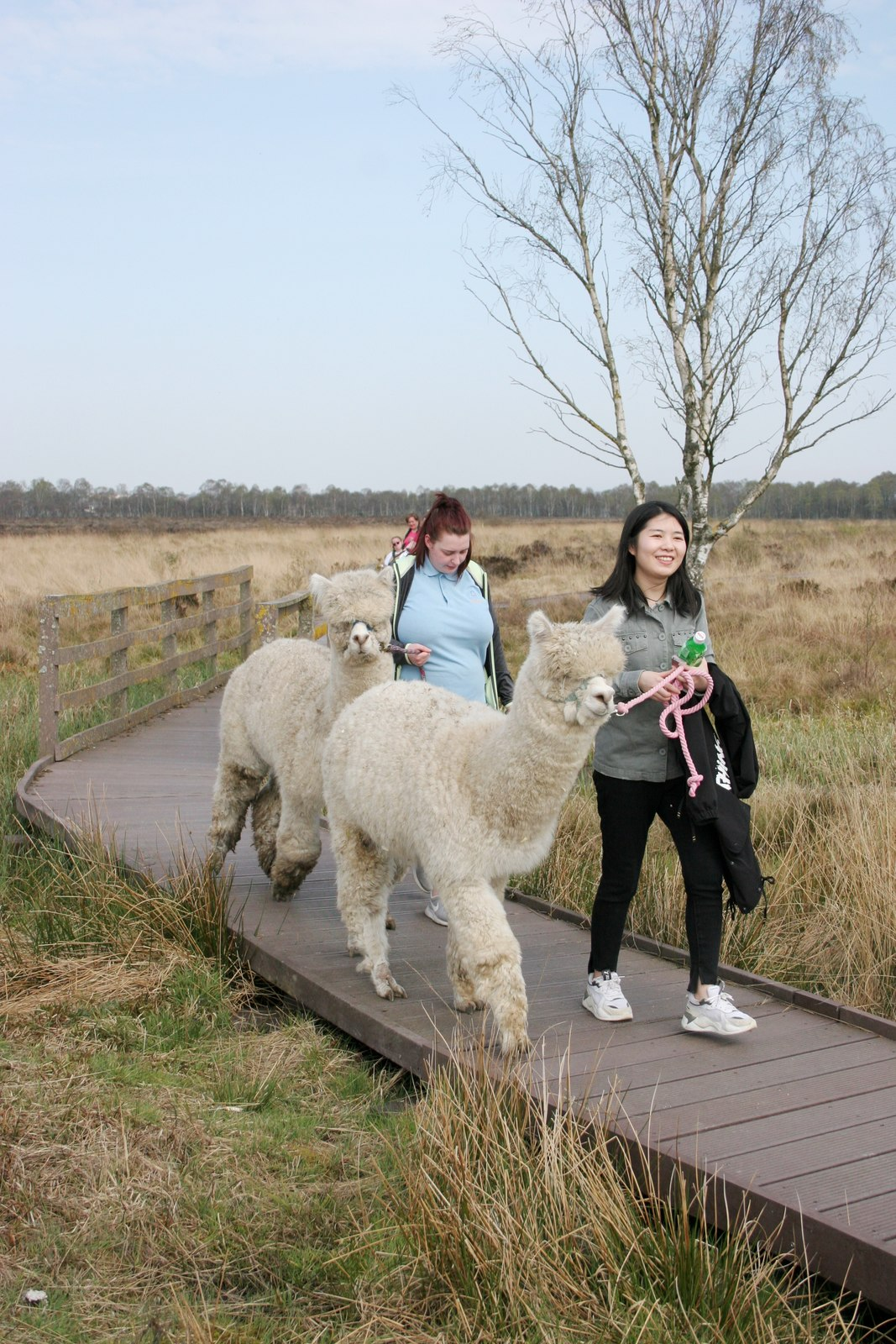
Walking with an alpaca at Flanders Moss National Nature Reserve, Scotland.

Alpacas and llamas are suitable for close contact with children due to their docile and friendly natures. Parents have reported children being willing to walk twice as far when accompanied by llamas. Llama walks are a popular therapeutic activity for disabled children. Autistic children can respond especially well to llamas, sometimes the expressive eyes of the animal help them make their first sustained eye contact. According to author Kay Frydenborg, the good results llamas have with children may in part be due to how pleasant they are to touch.

== See also ==
- Llamero
