= Guard llama =

Camelids used to protect livestock

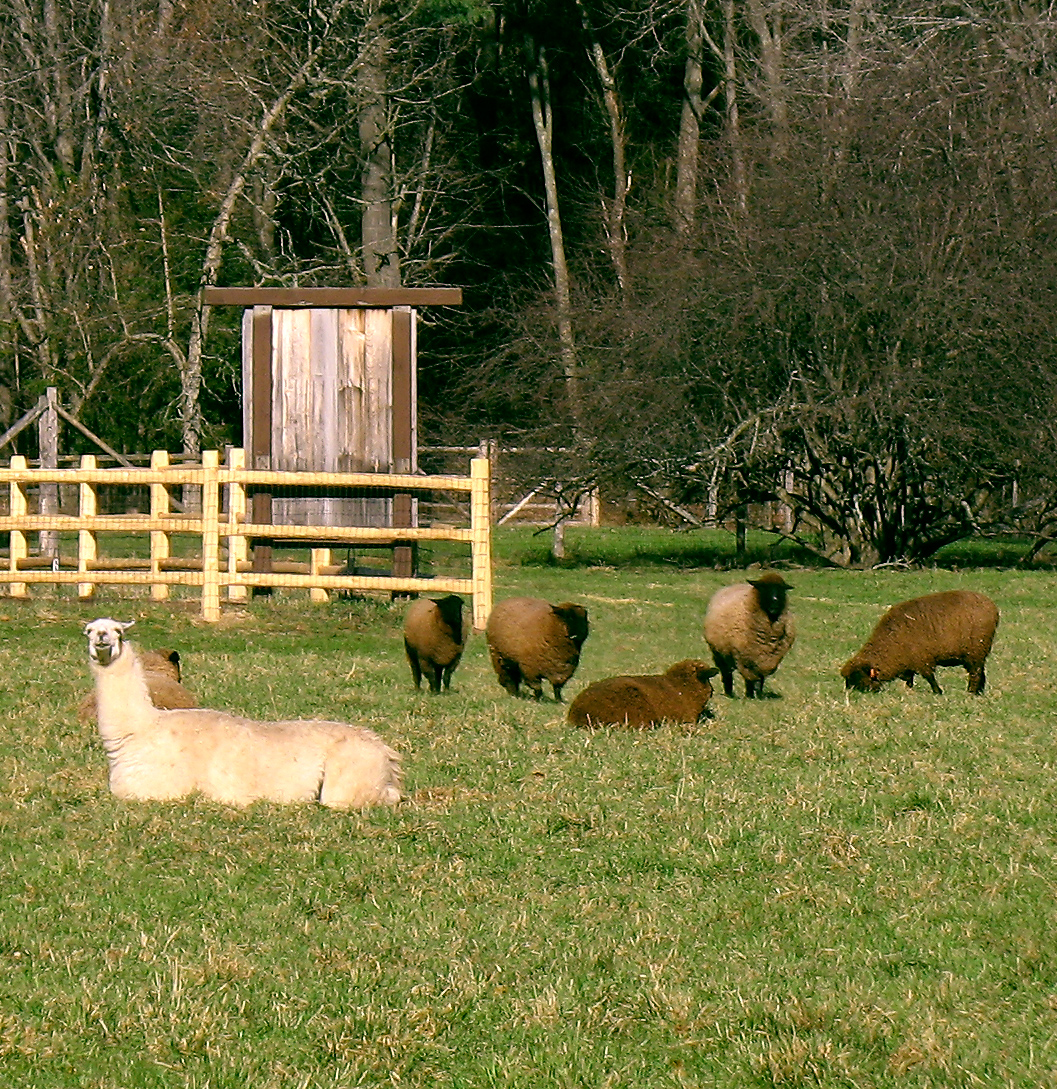
A guard llama protecting a flock of sheep

A guard llama is a llama that is used in farming to protect sheep, goats, hens or other livestock from canids such as coyotes, dingos, dogs, foxes and other predators. In the past, a single gelded (castrated) male was recommended. In more recent years, it has been discovered that single, unbred females make better and safer guardians.

== Guarding ==
Guard llamas may defend against predators in many ways. Llamas are instinctively alert and aware of their surroundings, and may draw attention to an intruder by making a startling alarm call that sounds like a rusty hinge. They may walk or run toward an intruder, and chase or kick or spit at it. Others may stand apart from the group and watch the intruder. Although llamas have been known to kill predators (such as coyotes), they should not be considered attack-animals. They are generally effective against single intruders only, not packs. Guard llamas have been most common on ranches located in the Western United States, where larger predators, such as the coyote, have been more prevalent. Not every llama will guard, however, and it should not be assumed that because it is a llama it will guard.

Research suggests the use of multiple guard llamas is not as effective as one. Multiple males tend to bond with one another, rather than with the livestock, and may ignore the flock. A gelded male of two years of age instinctively bonds with its new charges and is very effective in preventing predation. Some llamas appear to bond more quickly to sheep or goats if they are introduced just prior to lambing. Many sheep and goat producers indicate a special bond quickly develops between lambs and their guard llama and the llama is particularly protective of the lambs.

== Effectiveness ==
Most research on the effectiveness of guard llamas has been done with sheep. A 1990 study reported that 80% of sheep producers with guard llamas rated them as effective or very effective. The study found average rates of loss to predators fell from 22% to 8% after the introduction of a guard llama. In other studies, over half of guard llamas completely eliminated losses due to predators. Coyotes have been injured and even killed by llamas.

== See also ==
- Livestock guardian dog
- Sheep dog
- Donkey
- Llamero
