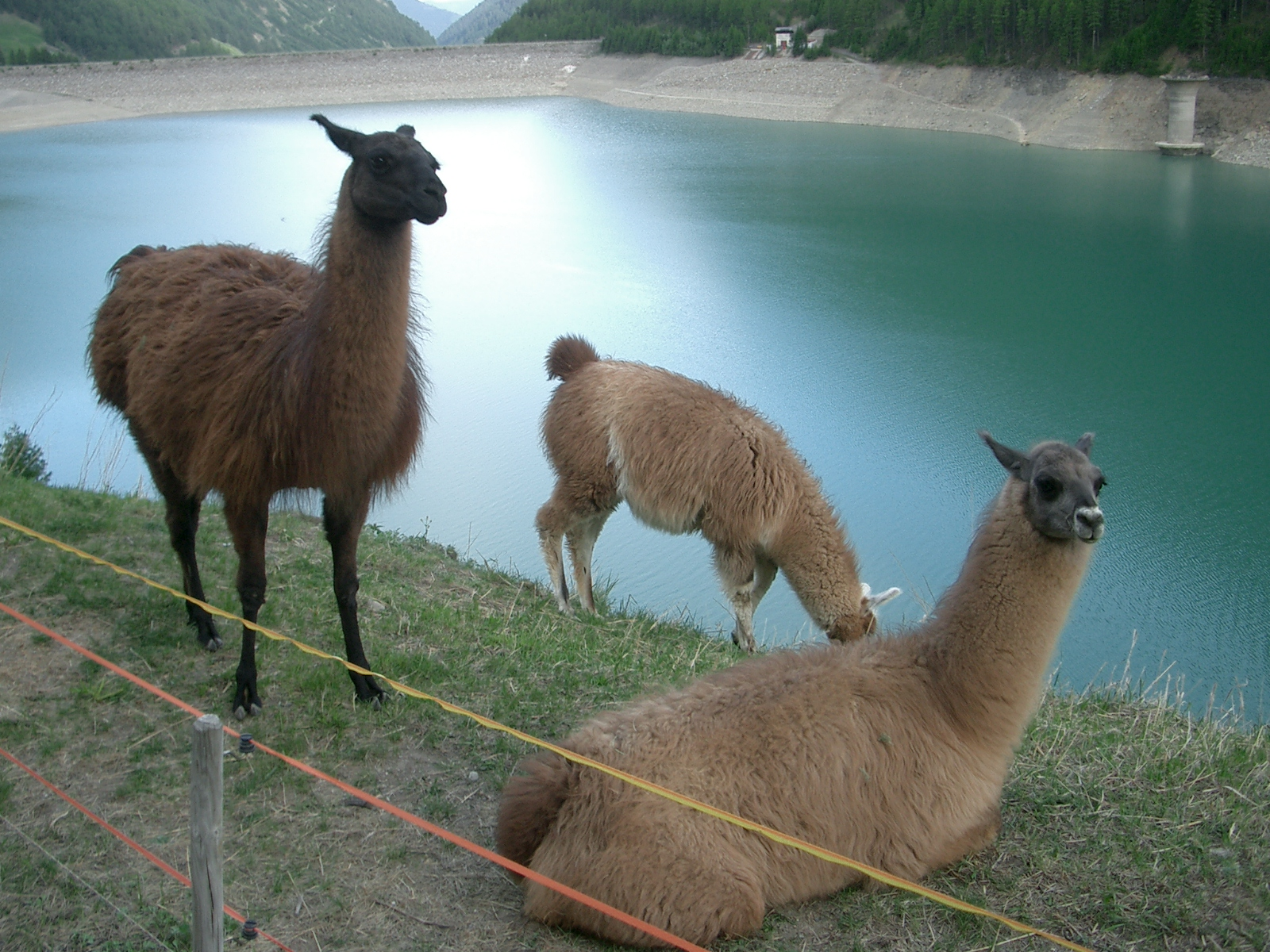
- Herd in South Tyrol, Italy

Conservation status
- Domesticated

Scientific classification
- Kingdom: Animalia
- Phylum: Chordata
- Class: Mammalia
- Order: Artiodactyla
- Family: Camelidae
- Genus: Lama
- Species: L. glama

Binomial name
- Lama glama (Linnaeus, 1758)
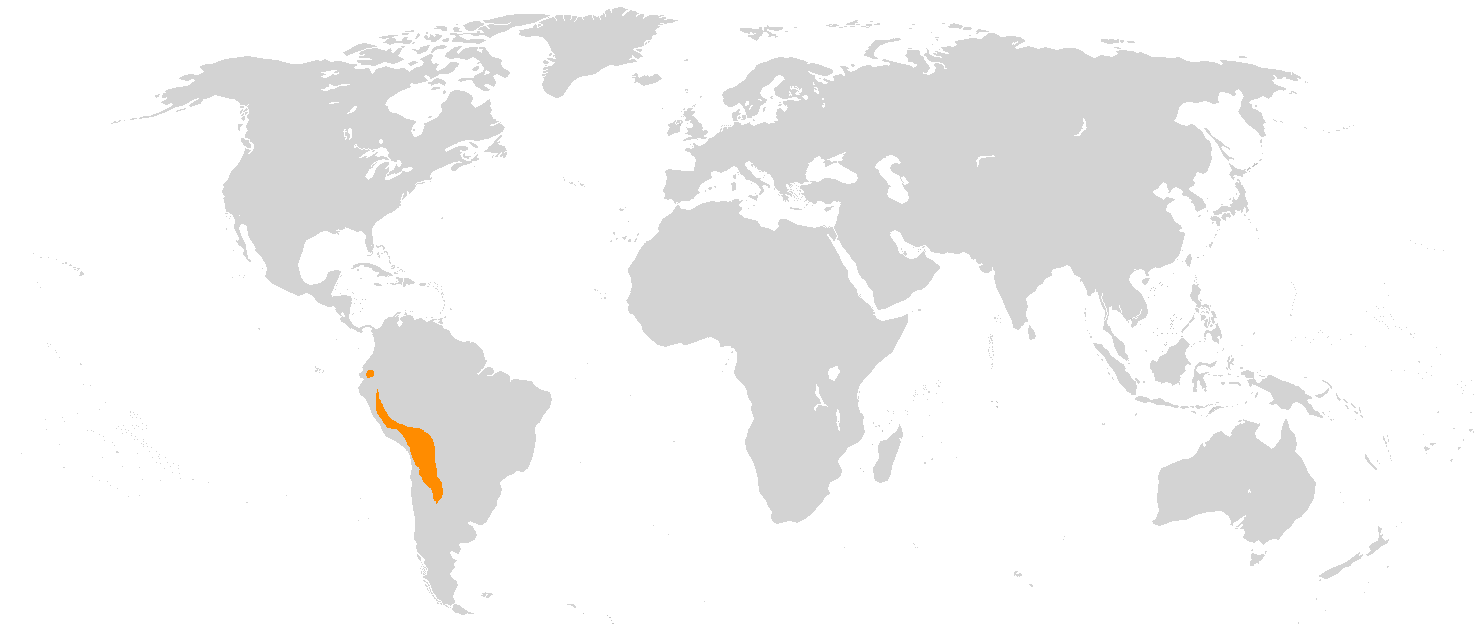
- domestic llama and alpaca range

Synonyms
- Camelus glama Linnaeus, 1758

= Llama =

Species of woolly domesticated mammal

The llama (/ˈlɑːmə/; Spanish pronunciation: [ˈʎama] or [ˈʝama]; Lama glama) is a domesticated South American camelid, widely used as a meat and pack animal by Andean cultures since the pre-Columbian era.

Llamas are social animals and live with others as a herd. Their wool is soft and contains only a small amount of lanolin. Llamas can learn simple tasks after a few repetitions. When using a pack, they can carry about 25 to 30% of their body weight for 8 to 13 km (5–8 miles). The name llama (also historically spelled "lama" or "glama") was adopted by European settlers from native Peruvian Quechua.

The ancestors of llamas are thought to have originated on the Great Plains of North America about 40 million years ago and subsequently migrated to South America about three million years ago during the Great American Interchange. By the end of the last ice age (10,000–12,000 years ago), camelids were extinct in North America. As of 2007, there were over seven million llamas and alpacas in South America. Some were imported to the United States and Canada late in the 20th century; their descendants now number more than 158,000 llamas and 100,000 alpacas.

In Aymara mythology, llamas are important beings. The Heavenly Llama is said to drink water from the ocean and urinates as it rains. According to Aymara eschatology, llamas will return to the water springs and ponds where they come from at the end of time.

== Classification ==
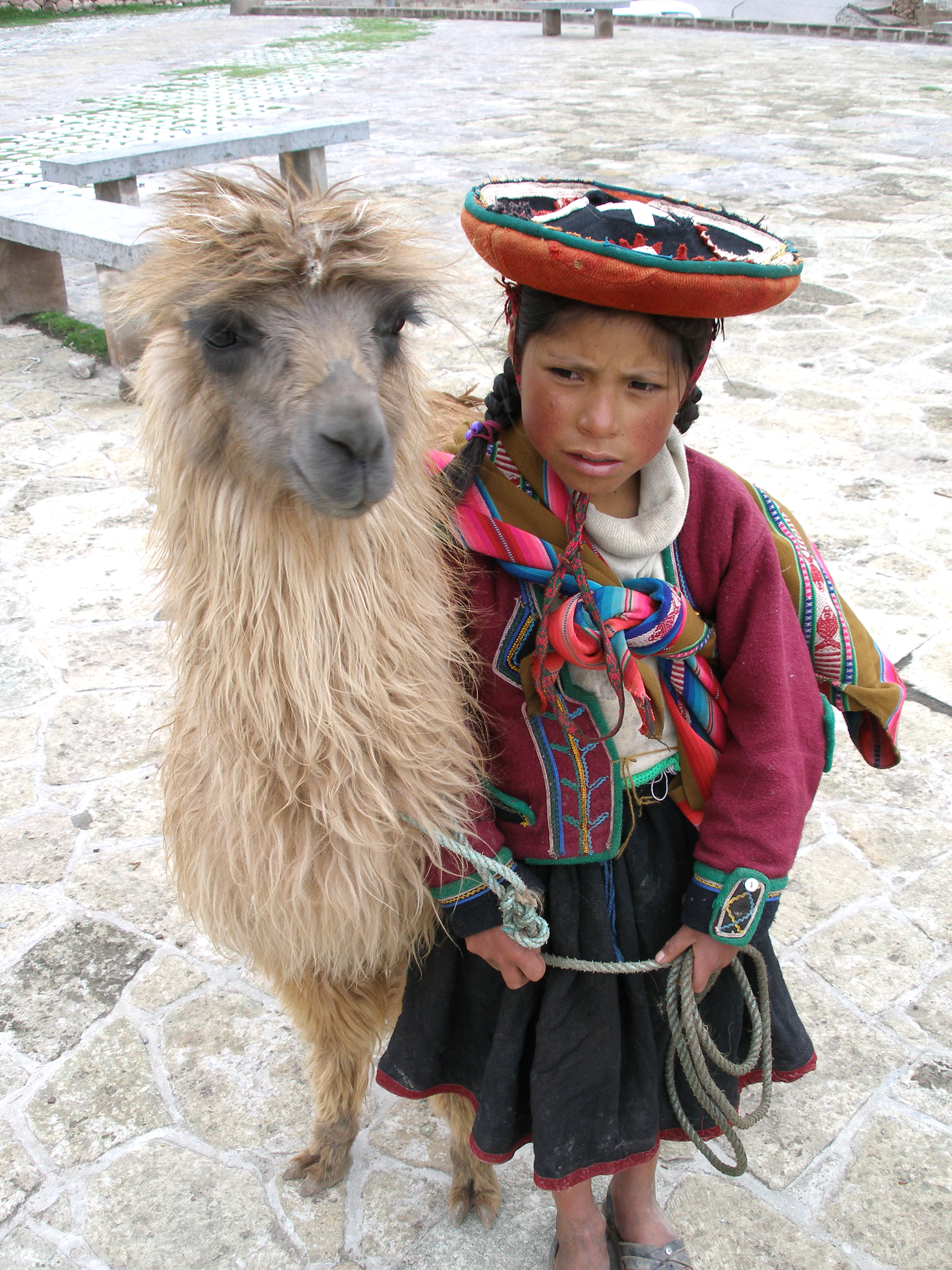
A Quechua girl in traditional dress with a llama in Cusco, Peru

Laminids consist of llamas (Lama glama), alpacas (Lama pacos), guanacos (Lama guanicoe) and vicuñas (Lama vicugna), the former two are domesticated while the latter two being wild. Although early writers compared llamas to sheep, their similarity to the camel was soon recognized. They were included in the genus Camelus along with alpaca in the Systema Naturae (1758) of Carl Linnaeus. They were, however, separated by Georges Cuvier in 1800 under the name of lama along with the guanaco. DNA analysis has confirmed that the guanaco is the wild ancestor of the llama, while the vicuña is the wild ancestor of the alpaca.

The genus Lama is, with the three species of true camels, the sole existing representatives of a very distinct section of the Artiodactyla (even-toed ungulates) called Tylopoda, or "bump-footed", from the peculiar bumps on the soles of their feet. The Tylopoda consists of a single family, the Camelidae, and shares the order Artiodactyla with the Suina (pigs), the Tragulina (chevrotains), the Pecora (ruminants), and the Whippomorpha (hippos and cetaceans, which belong to Artiodactyla from a cladistic, if not traditional, standpoint). The Tylopoda have more or less affinity to each of the sister taxa, standing in some respects in a middle position between them, sharing some characteristics from each, but in others showing special modifications not found in any of the other taxa.

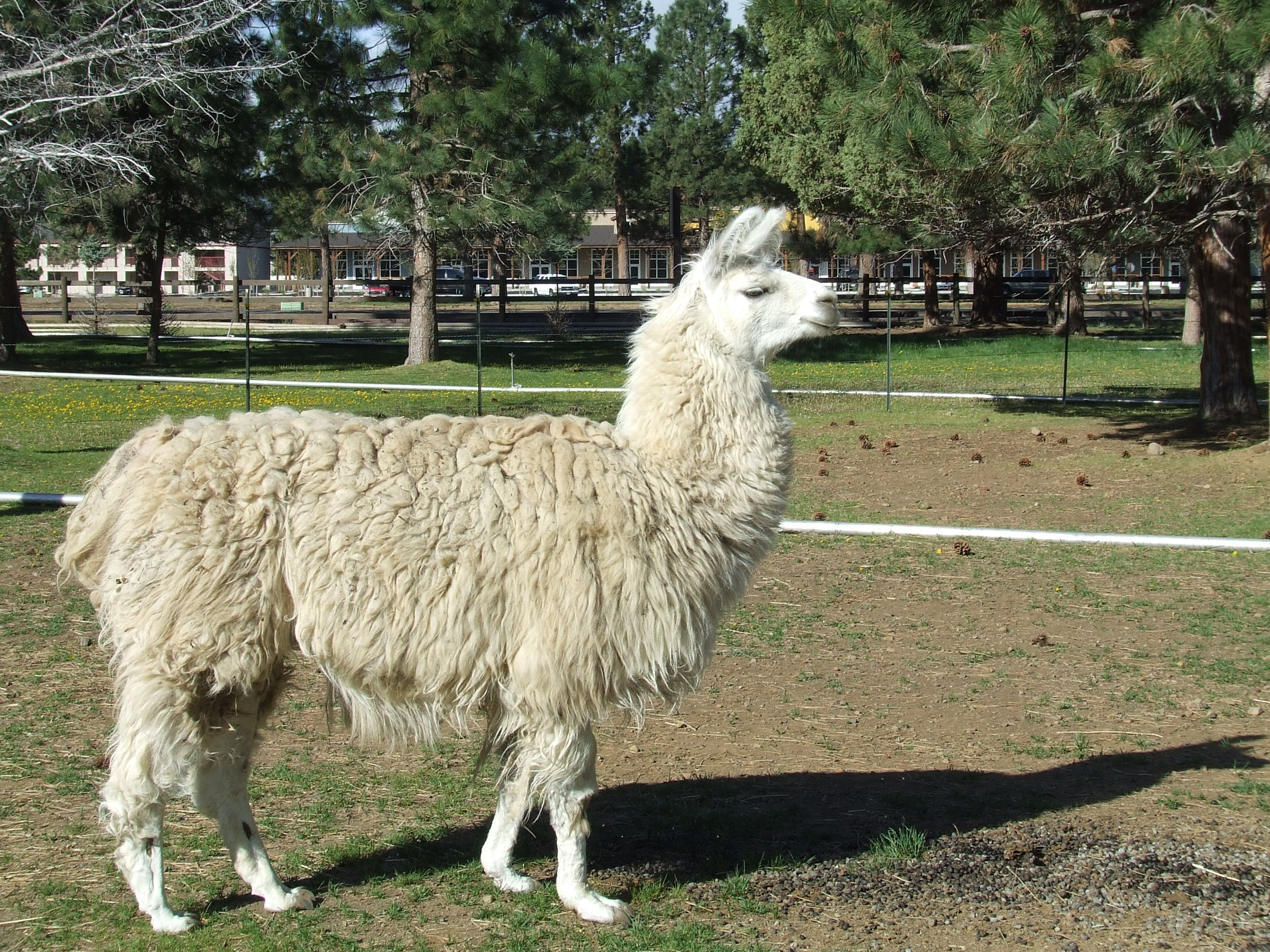
A domestic llama

The 19th-century discoveries of a vast and previously unexpected extinct Paleogene fauna of North America, as interpreted by paleontologists Joseph Leidy, Edward Drinker Cope, and Othniel Charles Marsh, aided understanding of the early history of this family. Llamas were not always confined to South America; abundant llama-like remains were found in Pleistocene deposits in the Rocky Mountains and in Central America. Some of the fossil llamas were much larger than current forms. Some species remained in North America during the last ice ages. North American llamas are categorized as an extinct genus, Hemiauchenia. Llama-like animals would have been a common sight 25,000 years ago in modern-day California, Texas, New Mexico, Utah, Missouri, and Florida.

The camelid lineage has a good fossil record. Camel-like animals have been traced back through early Miocene forms from the thoroughly differentiated, modern species. Their characteristics became more general, and they lost those that distinguished them as camelids; hence, they were classified as ancestral artiodactyls. No fossils of these earlier forms have been found in the Old World, indicating that North America was the original home of camelids and that the ancestors of Old World camels crossed over via the Bering Land Bridge from North America. The formation of the Isthmus of Panama three million years ago allowed camelids to spread to South America as part of the Great American Interchange, where they evolved further. Meanwhile, North American camelids died out at the end of the Pleistocene.

== Characteristics ==
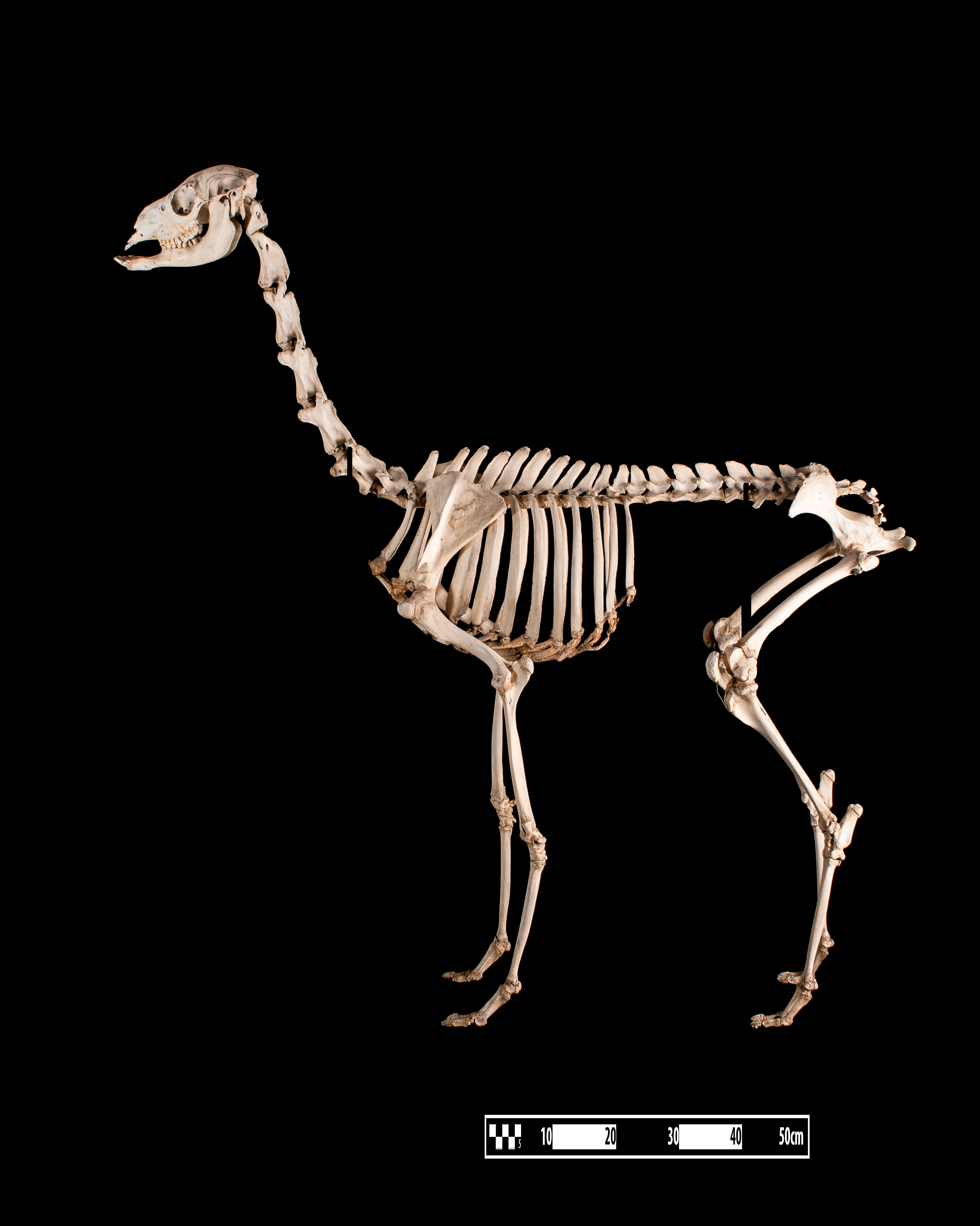
Skeleton of a llama

A full-grown llama can reach a height of 1.7 to 1.8 m (5 ft 7 in to 5 ft 11 in) at the top of the head and can weigh between 130 and 272 kg (287 and 600 lb). At maturity, males can weigh 94.74 kg, while females can weigh 102.27 kg. At birth, a baby llama (called a cria) can weigh between 9 and 14 kg (20 and 31 lb). Llamas typically live for 15 to 25 years, with some individuals surviving 30 years or more.

The following characteristics apply especially to llamas. Dentition of adults: incisors 1/3 canines 1/1, premolars 2/2, molars 3/3; total 32. In the upper jaw, a compressed, sharp, pointed laniariform incisor near the hinder edge of the premaxilla is followed in the male at least by a moderate-sized, pointed, curved true canine in the anterior part of the maxilla. The isolated canine-like premolar that follows in the camels is not present. The teeth of the molar series, which are in contact with each other, consist of two very small premolars (the first almost rudimentary) and three broad molars, generally constructed like those of Camelus. In the lower jaw, the three incisors are long, spatulate, and procumbent; the outer ones are the smallest. Next to these is a curved, suberect canine, followed after an interval by an isolated minute and often deciduous simple conical premolar; then a contiguous series of one premolar and three molars, which differ from those of Camelus in having a small accessory column at the anterior outer edge.

Names of llama body parts: 1 ears – 2 poll – 3 withers – 4 back – 5 hip – 6 croup – 7 base of tail – 8 tail – 9 buttock – 10 hock – 11 metatarsal gland – 12 heel – 13 cannon bone – 14 gaskin – 15 stifle joint – 16 flank – 17 barrel – 18 elbow – 19 pastern – 20 fetlock – 21 Knee – 22 Chest – 23 point of shoulder – 24 shoulder – 25 throat – 26 cheek or jowl – 27 muzzle

The skull generally resembles a Camelus, with a larger brain cavity and orbits and less-developed cranial ridges due to its smaller size. The nasal bones are shorter and broader and are joined by the premaxilla.

Vertebrae:

- cervical 7,
- dorsal 12,
- lumbar 7,
- sacral 4,
- caudal 15 to 20.

The ears are rather long and slightly curved inward, characteristically known as "banana" shaped. There is no dorsal hump. The feet are narrow, the toes being more separated than in the camels, each having a distinct plantar pad. The tail is short, and the fiber is long, woolly, and soft.

In essential structural characteristics, as well as in general appearance and habits, all the animals of this genus very closely resemble each other, so whether they should be considered as belonging to one, two, or more species is a matter of controversy among naturalists.

The question is complicated by the circumstances of most individuals who have come under observation, either in a completely or partially domesticated state. Many are also descended from ancestors previously domesticated, a state that tends to produce a certain amount of variation from the original type. The four forms commonly distinguished by the inhabitants of South America are recognized as distinct species, though there are difficulties in defining their distinctive characteristics.

These are:

- the llama, Lama glama (Linnaeus);
- the alpaca, Lama pacos (Linnaeus);
- the guanaco (from the Quechua huanaco), Lama guanicoe (Müller); and
- the vicuña, Lama vicugna (Molina)

The llama and alpaca are only known in the domestic state and are variable in size and of many colors, often white, brown, or piebald. Some are grey or black. The guanaco and vicuña are wild. The guanaco is endangered; it has a nearly uniform light-brown color, passing into white below.

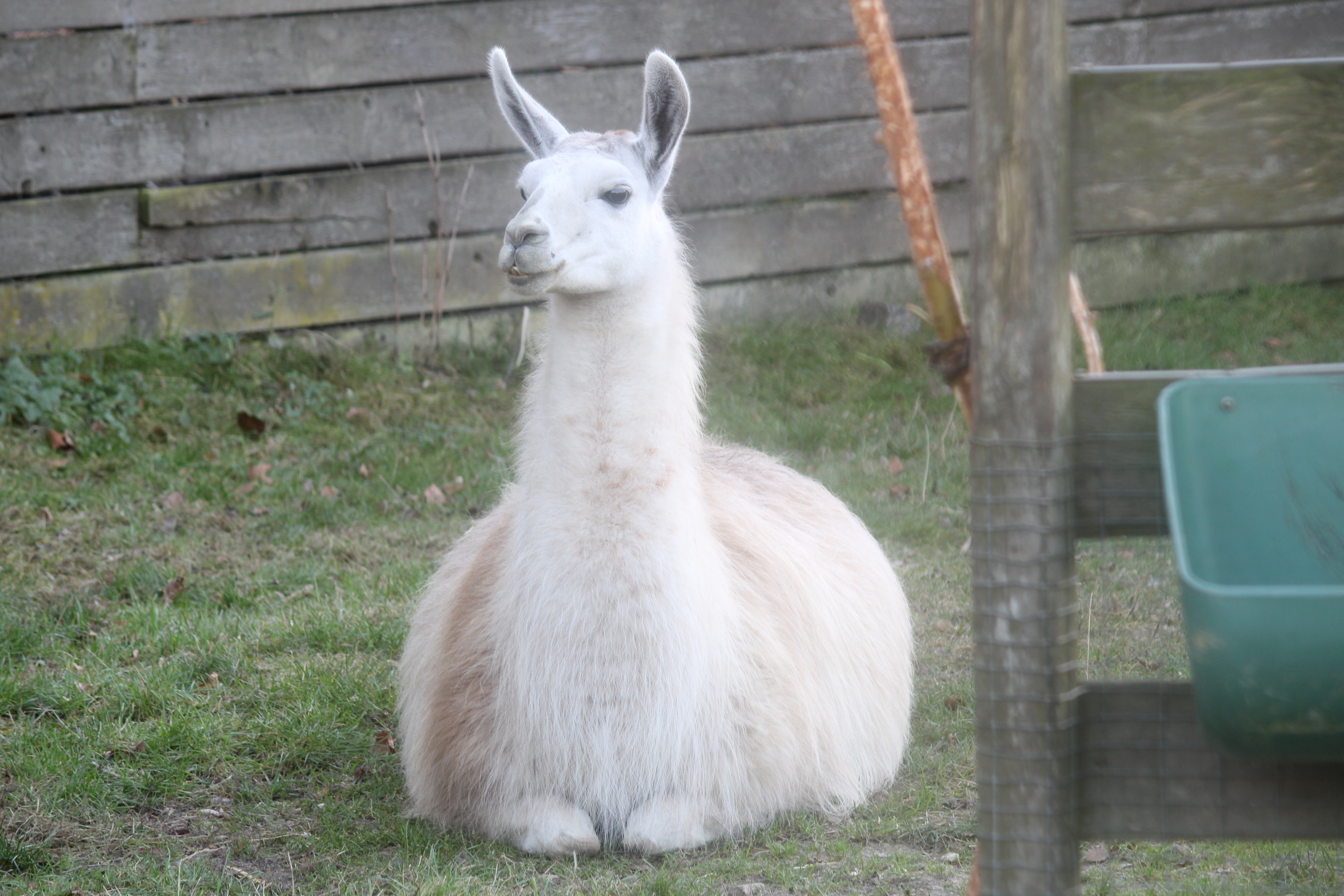
Llama at Copenhagen Zoo

The guanaco and vicuña certainly differ: The vicuña is more petite, more slender in its proportions, and has a shorter head than the guanaco.

The vicuña lives in herds on the bleak and elevated parts of the mountain range bordering the region of perpetual snow, amidst rocks and precipices, occurring in various suitable localities throughout Peru, in the southern part of Ecuador, and as far south as the middle of Bolivia. Its manners very much resemble those of the chamois of the European Alps; it is as vigilant, wild, and timid.

Vicuña fiber is extremely delicate and soft and highly valued for weaving, but the quantity that each animal produces is small. Alpacas are primarily descended from wild vicuña ancestors. In contrast, domesticated llamas are descended primarily from wild guanaco ancestors, although a considerable amount of hybridization between the two species has occurred.

Differential characteristics between llamas and alpacas include the llama's larger size, longer head, and curved ears. Alpaca fiber is generally more expensive but not always more valuable. Alpacas tend to have a more consistent color throughout the body. The most apparent visual difference between llamas and camels is that camels have a humps and llamas do not.

Llamas are not ruminants or modified ruminants. They do have a complex three-compartment stomach that allows them to digest lower quality, high cellulose foods. The stomach compartments allow for fermentation of tricky foodstuffs, followed by regurgitation and re-chewing. Ruminants (cows, sheep, goats) have four compartments, whereas llamas have only three stomach compartments: the rumen, omasum, and abomasum.

In addition, the llama (and other camelids) have an extremely long and complex large intestine (colon). The large intestine's role in digestion is to reabsorb water, vitamins, and electrolytes from food waste passing through it. The length of the llama's colon allows it to survive on much less water than other animals. This is a major advantage in arid climates where they live.

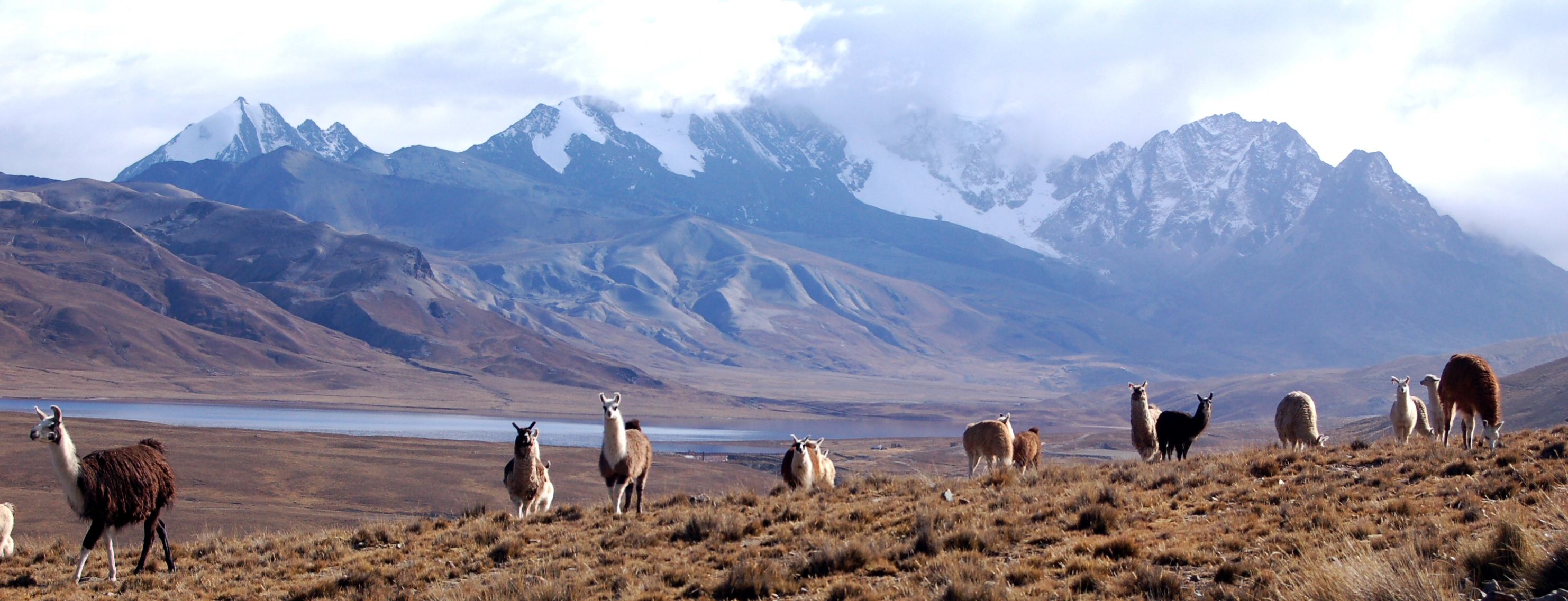
A herd of llamas grazing by the side of the road in the Bolivian Andes. The species is fully domesticated.

== Reproduction ==
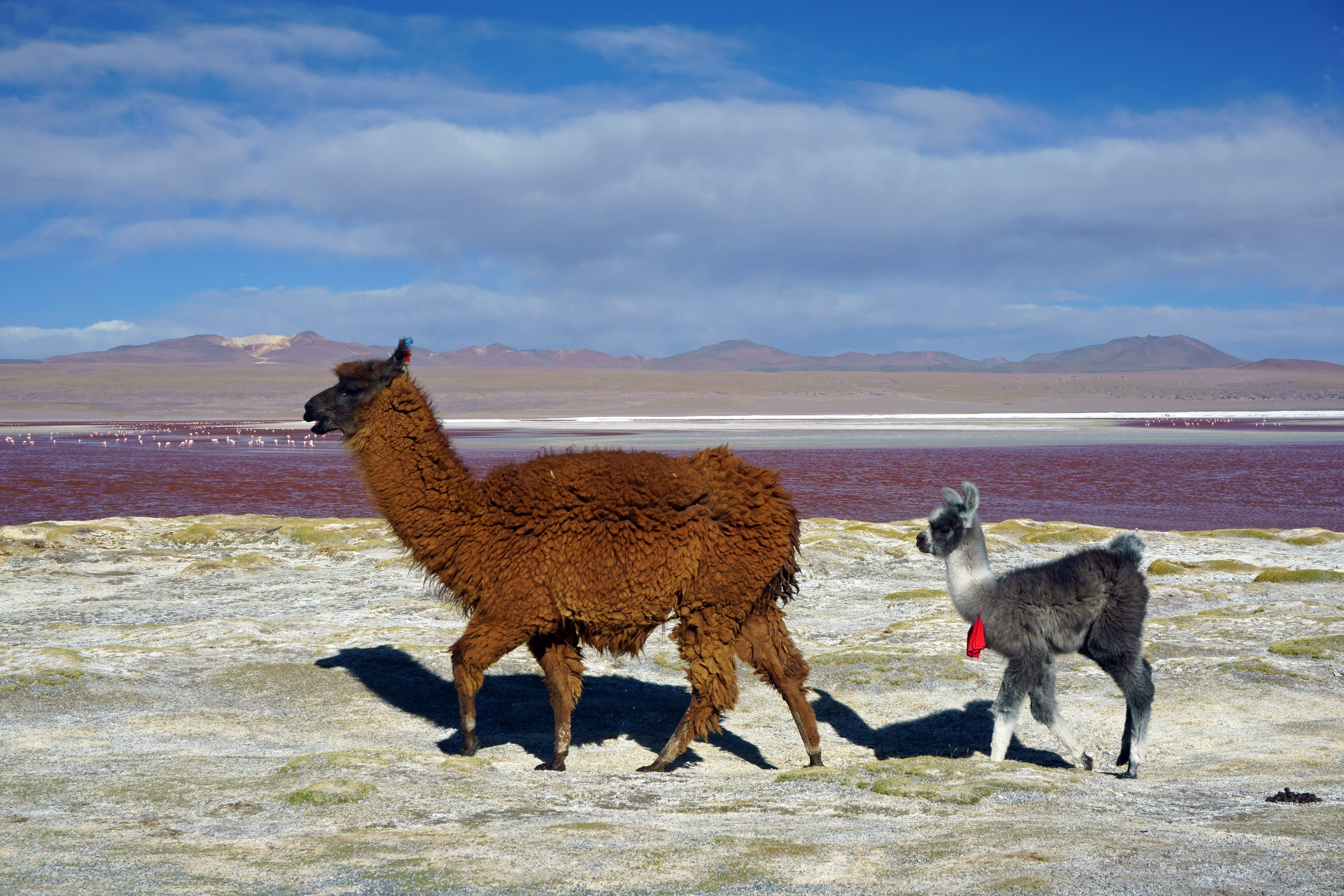
Dam and her cria at Laguna Colorada, Reserva Nacional de Fauna Andina Eduardo Avaroa, Bolivia

Llamas have an unusual reproductive cycle for a large animal. Female llamas are induced ovulators. Through mating, the female releases an egg and is often fertilized on the first attempt. Female llamas do not go into estrus ("heat").

Like humans, llama males and females mature sexually at different rates. Females reach puberty at about 12 months old; males do not become sexually mature until around three years of age.

=== Mating ===
Llamas mate in a kush (lying down) position, similar to big cats and canines, which is unusual in a large animal. They mate for an extended time (20–45 minutes), also unusual in a large animal.

=== Gestation ===
The gestation period of a llama averages 11.5 months (350 days). Dams (female llamas) do not lick off their babies, as they have an attached tongue that does not reach outside of the mouth more than 13 millimetres (1/2 inch). Rather, they will nuzzle and hum to their newborns.

=== Crias ===
A cria (from Spanish for "baby") is the name for a baby llama, alpaca, vicuña, or guanaco. Crias are typically born with all the herd's females gathering to protect against the male llamas and potential predators. Llamas give birth standing. Birth is usually quick and problem-free, over in less than 30 minutes. Most births occur between 8 am and noon, during the warmer daylight hours. This may increase cria survival by reducing fatalities due to hypothermia during cold Andean nights. This birthing pattern is considered a continuation of the birthing patterns observed in the wild. Their crias are up and standing, walking, and attempting to suckle within the first hour after birth. Crias are partially fed with llama milk that is lower in fat and salt and higher in phosphorus and calcium than cow or goat milk. A female llama will only produce about 60 millilitres (2 US fluid ounces) of milk at a time when she gives milk, so the cria must frequently suckle to receive the nutrients it requires.

=== Breeding methods ===
In harem mating, the male is left with females most of the year.

For field mating, a female is turned into a field with a male llama and left there for some time. This is the easiest method in terms of labor but the least useful in predicting a likely birth date. An ultrasound test can be performed, and together with the exposure dates, a better idea of when the cria is expected can be determined.

Hand mating is the most efficient method, but it requires the most work on the part of the human involved. A male and female llama are put into the same pen, and mating is monitored. They are then separated and re-mated every other day until one refuses the mating. Usually, one can get in two matings using this method, though some stud males routinely refuse to mate a female more than once. The separation presumably helps to keep the sperm count high for each mating and also helps to keep the condition of the female llama's reproductive tract more sound. If the mating is unsuccessful within two to three weeks, the female is mated again.

== Nutrition ==
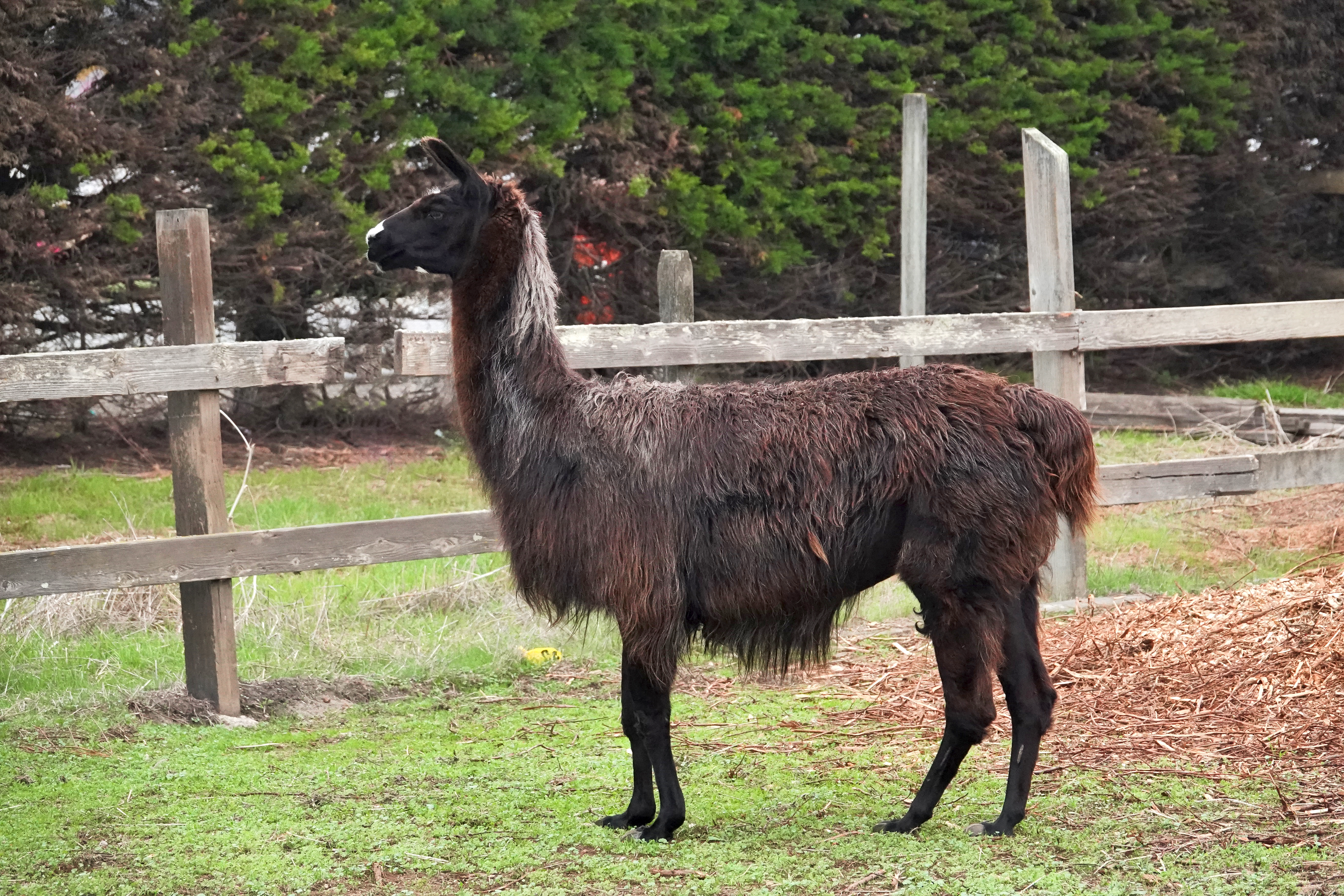
A black llama

Options for feeding llamas are quite wide; various commercial and farm-based feeds are available. The major determining factors include feed cost, availability, nutrient balance and energy density required. Young, actively growing llamas require a greater concentration of nutrients than mature animals because of their smaller digestive tract capacities.

Estimated daily requirements of bromegrass hay, alfalfa hay and corn silage on an as-fed and 100% dry matter basis for llamas from 22 to 550 pounds.
| Body weight (lb) | Bromegrass | | Alfalfa | | Corn silage | |
| Body weight (lb) | (as fed) | (dry matter) | (as fed) | (dry matter) | (as fed) | (dry matter) |
|---|---|---|---|---|---|---|
| 22 | 0.8 | 0.7 | 0.5 | 0.5 | 1.5 | 0.4 |
| 44 | 1.3 | 1.1 | 0.9 | 0.8 | 2.6 | 0.7 |
| 88 | 2.1 | 1.9 | 1.5 | 1.3 | 4.3 | 1.2 |
| 110 | 2.6 | 2.3 | 1.7 | 1.6 | 5.2 | 1.4 |
| 165 | 3.4 | 3.1 | 2.3 | 2.1 | 6.9 | 1.9 |
| 275 | 5.0 | 4.5 | 3.4 | 3.1 | 10.1 | 2.8 |
| 385 | 6.4 | 5.7 | 4.3 | 3.9 | 12.9 | 3.6 |
| 495 | 7.8 | 7.0 | 5.3 | 4.8 | 15.8 | 4.4 |
| 550 | 8.5 | 7.6 | 5.7 | 5.2 | 17.0 | 4.8 |

== Behavior ==
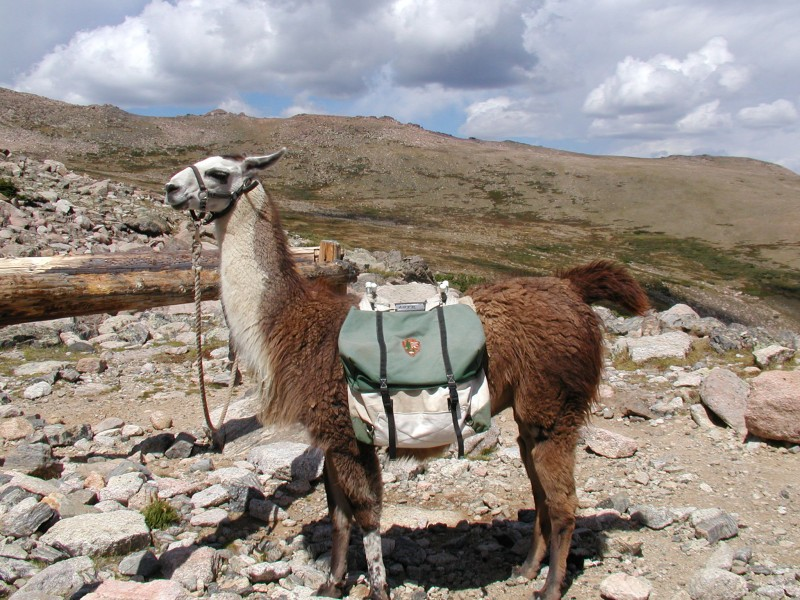
A pack llama in the Rocky Mountain National Park

Llamas that are well-socialized and trained to halter and lead after weaning are very friendly and pleasant to be around. They are extremely curious, and most will approach people easily. However, llamas that are bottle-fed or over-socialized and over-handled as youth will become extremely difficult to handle when mature, when they will begin to treat humans as they treat each other, which is characterized by bouts of spitting, kicking and neck wrestling.

Llamas are now utilized as certified therapy animals in nursing homes and hospitals. Rojo the Llama, located in the Pacific Northwest was certified in 2008. The Mayo Clinic says animal-assisted therapy can reduce pain, depression, anxiety, and fatigue. This type of therapy is growing in popularity, and several organizations throughout the United States participate.

Llamas living in pastures are very clean, choosing one or a few locations to defecate and urinate, and there is no offensive odor to their manure. Like horses, llamas occasionally enjoy dust baths. Llamas may kick when they feel threatened or startled by a person approaching from behind. Their powerful hind legs can pack formidable force when they kick, which is a key component of their abilities as effective livestock guardians.

When correctly reared, llamas spitting at a human is a rare thing. Llamas are very social herd animals, however, and sometimes spit at each other to discipline lower-ranked llamas. A llama's social rank in a herd is never static. They can always move up or down the social ladder by picking small fights. This is usually done between males to see which will become dominant. Their fights are visually dramatic, characterized by spitting, ramming each other with their chests, neck wrestling, and kicking, mainly to knock the other off balance. The females are usually only seen spitting to control other herd members. One may determine how agitated the llama is by the materials in the spit. The more irritated the llama is, the further back into each of the three stomach compartments it will try to draw materials from for its spit.

While the social structure might constantly change, they live as a family and care for each other. If one notices a strange noise or feels threatened, an alarm call - a loud, shrill sound that rhythmically rises and falls - is sent out, and all others become alert. They will often hum to each other as a form of communication.

The llama's groaning noises or going "mwa" (/mwaʰ/) is often a sign of fear or anger. Unhappy or agitated llamas will lay their ears back, while ears being perked upwards is a sign of happiness or curiosity.

An "orgle" is the mating sound of a llama or alpaca, made by the sexually aroused male. The sound is reminiscent of gargling but with a more forceful, buzzing edge. Males begin the sound when they become aroused and continue throughout copulation.

=== Guard behavior ===
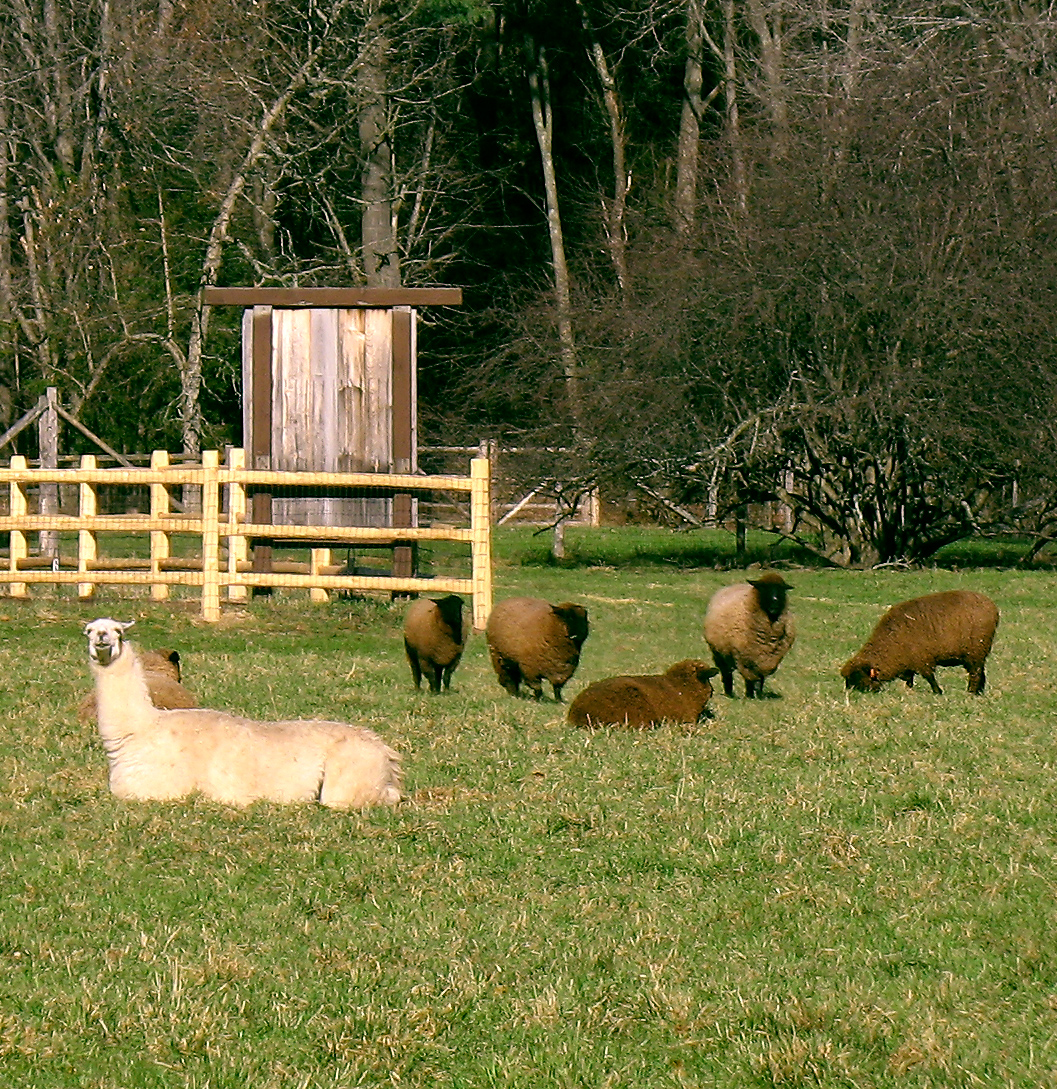
A llama guarding a flock of sheep at a farm in Massachusetts

Using llamas as livestock guards in North America began in the early 1980s, and some sheep producers have used llamas successfully since then. Some would even use them to guard their smaller cousins, the alpaca. They are used most commonly in the western regions of the United States, where larger predators, such as coyotes and feral dogs, are prevalent. Typically, a single gelding (castrated male) is used.

Research suggests using multiple guard llamas is not as effective as one. Multiple males tend to bond with one another rather than with the livestock and may ignore the flock. A gelded male of two years of age bonds closely with its new charges and is instinctively very effective in preventing predation. Some llamas bond more quickly to sheep or goats if introduced just before lambing. Many sheep and goat producers indicate a special bond quickly develops between lambs and their guard llama, and the llama is particularly protective of the lambs.

Using llamas as guards has reduced the losses to predators for many producers. The value of the livestock saved each year exceeds a llama's purchase cost and annual maintenance. Although not every llama is suited to the job, most are a viable, nonlethal alternative for reducing predation, requiring no training and little care.

== Fiber ==
Llamas have a fine undercoat, which can be used for handicrafts and garments. The coarser outer guard hair is used for rugs, wall hangings, and lead ropes. The fiber comes in many colors, ranging from white or grey to reddish-brown, brown, dark brown, and black.

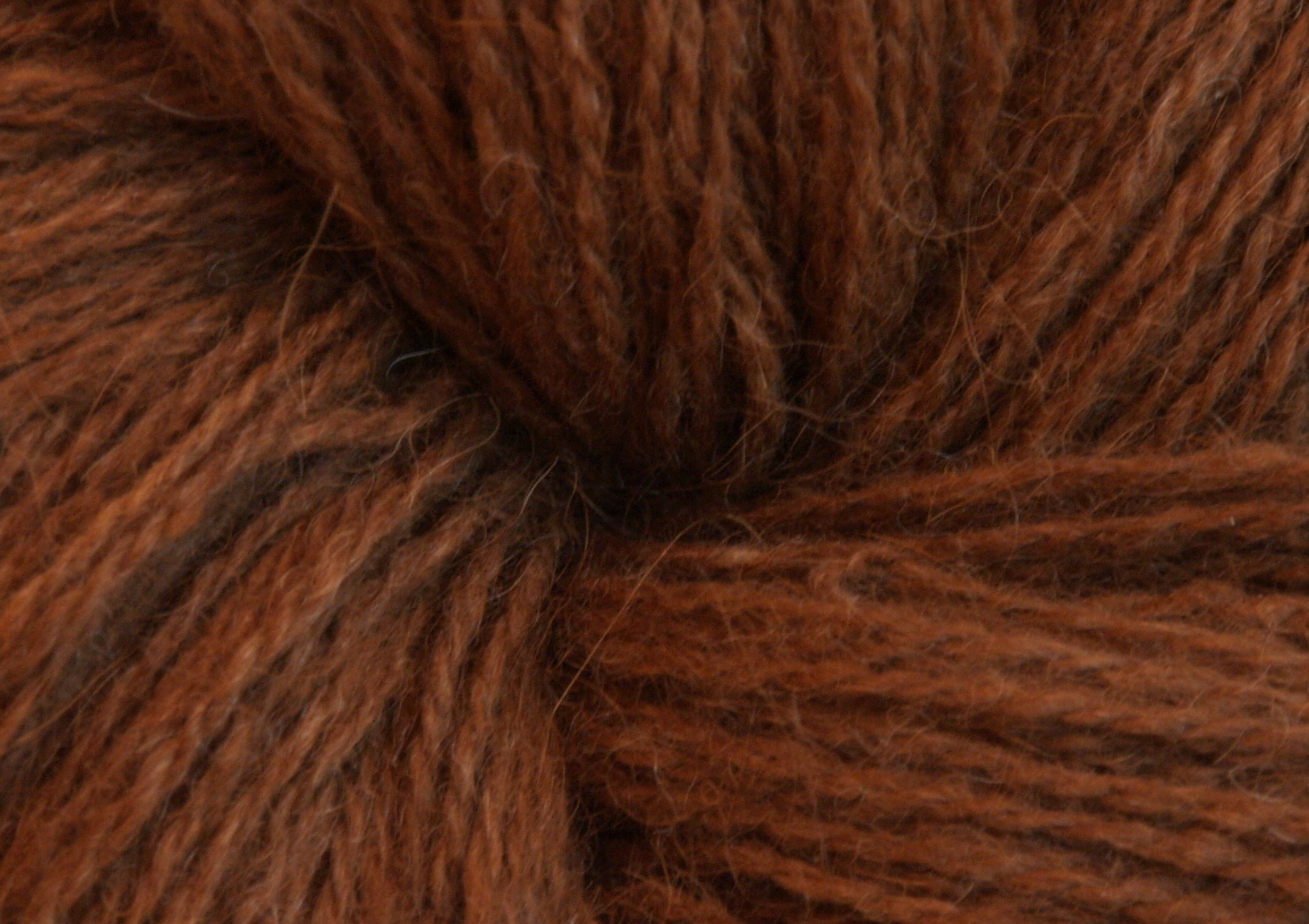
Handspun llama yarn from Patagonia

Average diameter of some of the finest, natural fibers
| Animal | Fiber diameter (micrometres) |
|---|---|
| Vicuña | 6–10 |
| Alpaca (Suri) | 10–15 |
| Muskox (Qiviut) | 11–13 |
| Merino sheep | 12–20 |
| Angora rabbit (Angora wool) | 13 |
| Cashmere goat (Cashmere wool) | 15–19 |
| Yak (Yak fiber) | 15–19 |
| Camel (Camel hair) | 16–25 |
| Guanaco | 16–18 |
| Llama (Tapada) | 20–30 |
| Chinchilla | 21 |
| Angora goat (Mohair) | 25–45 |
| Huacaya alpaca | 27.7 |
| Llama (Ccara) | 30–40 |

== Medical uses ==
Doctors and researchers have determined that llamas possess antibodies that are well-suited to treat certain diseases. Scientists have been studying the way llamas might contribute to the fight against coronaviruses, including MERS and SARS-CoV-2 (which causes COVID-19).

== History of domestication ==
=== Pre-Incan cultures ===
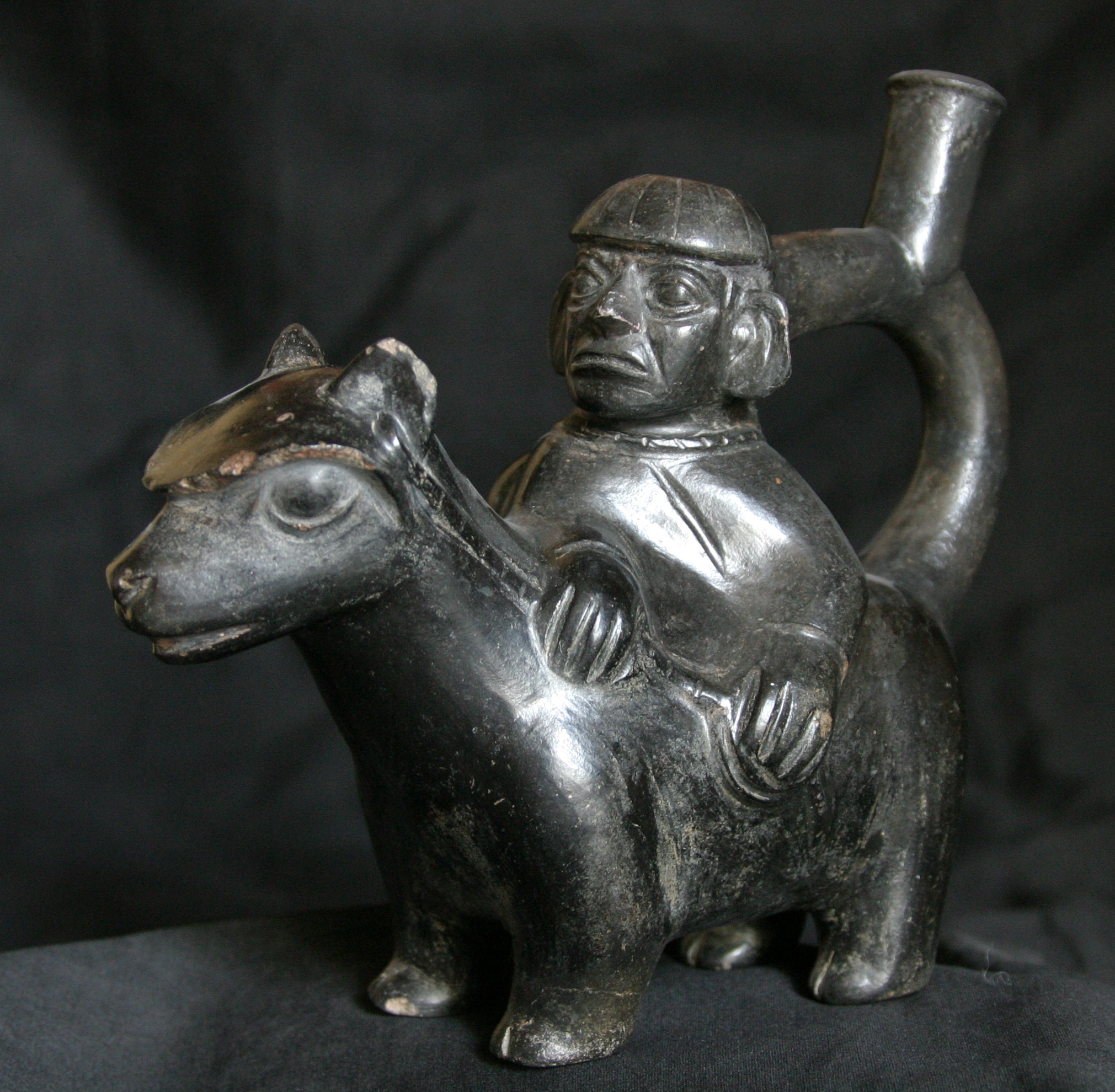
Moche sculpture, dated to 100–300 AD (Early Intermediate Period) from the Lombards Museum

Scholar Alex Chepstow-Lusty has argued that the switch from a hunter-gatherer lifestyle to widespread agriculture was only possible because of the use of llama dung as fertilizer.

The Moche people frequently placed llamas and their parts in the burials of important people as offerings or provisions for the afterlife. The Moche of pre-Columbian Peru depicted llamas quite realistically in their ceramics.

=== Inca Empire ===
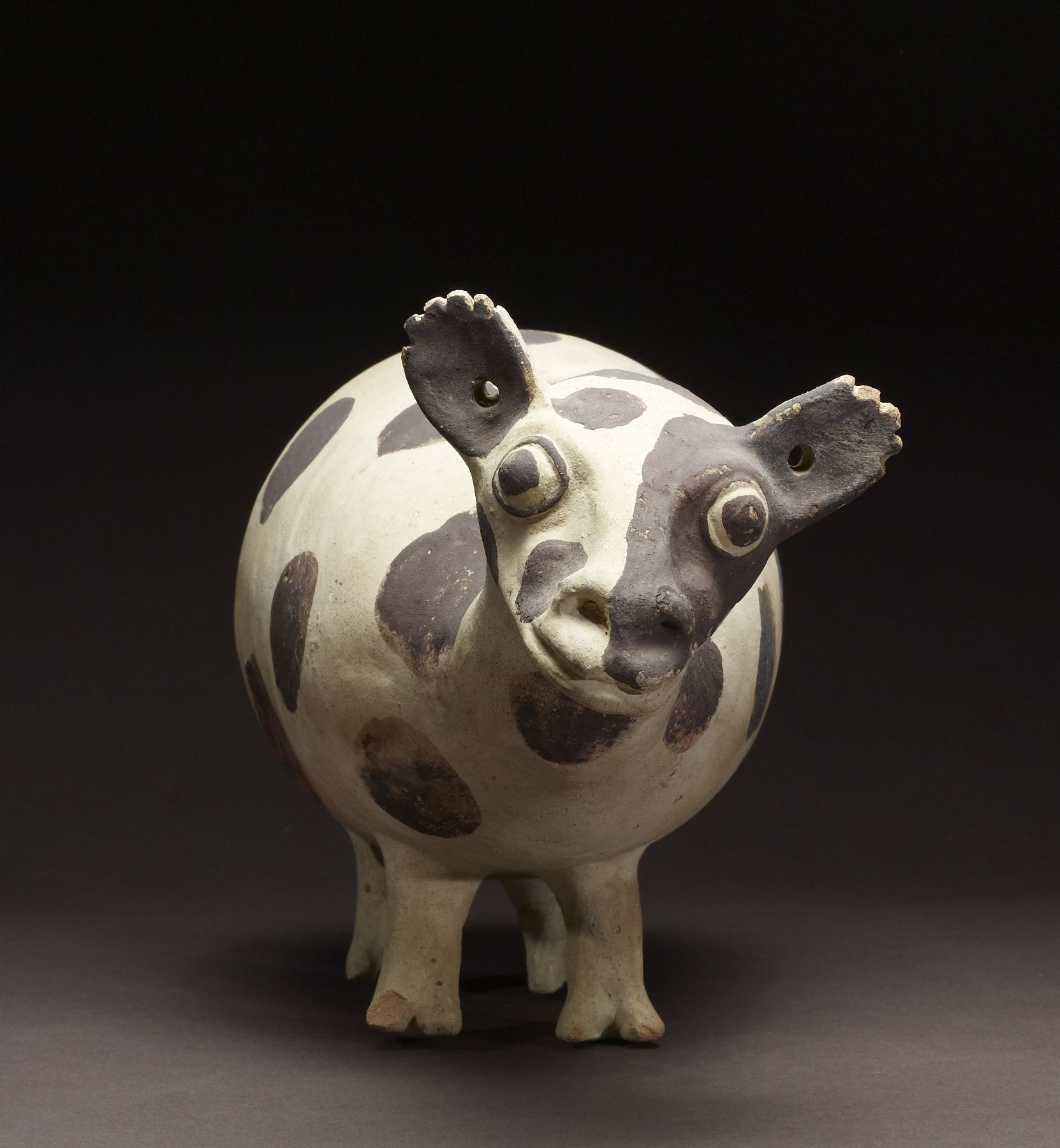
This sculpture, originating from the Chancay Valley and adjacent Chillón Drainage region (Late Intermediate Period), captures the llama's natural inquisitiveness. The Walters Art Museum.

In the Inca Empire, llamas were the only beasts of burden, and many of the people dominated by the Inca had long traditions of llama herding. For the Inca nobility, the llama was symbolic, and llama figures were often buried with the dead. In South America, llamas are still used as beasts of burden, as well as for the production of fiber and meat.

The Inca deity Urcuchillay was depicted in the form of a multicolored llama.

Carl Troll has argued that the large numbers of llamas found in the southern Peruvian highlands were an essential factor in the rise of the Inca Empire. It is worth considering the maximum extent of the Inca Empire roughly coincided with the most significant distribution of alpacas and llamas in Pre-Hispanic America. The link between the Andean biomes of puna and páramo, llama pastoralism and the Inca state is a matter of research.

=== Spanish Empire ===
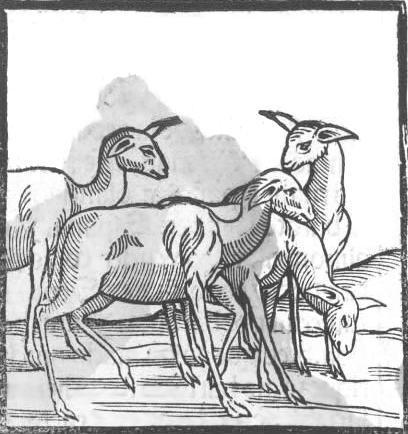
The first image of llamas in Europe, 1553

One of the main uses for llamas at the time of the Spanish conquest was to bring down ore from the mines in the mountains. Gregory de Bolivar estimated that in his day, as many as 300,000 were employed in the transport of produce from the Potosí mines alone, but since the introduction of horses, mules, and donkeys, the importance of the llama as a beast of burden has greatly diminished.

According to Juan Ignacio Molina, the Dutch captain Joris van Spilbergen observed the use of hueques (possibly a llama type) by native Mapuches of Mocha Island as plow animals in 1614.

In Chile, hueque populations declined towards extinction in the 16th and 17th century being replaced by European livestock. The causes of its extinction are not clear. However, it is known that the introduction of sheep caused some competition among both domestic species. Anecdotal evidence of the mid-17th century shows that both species coexisted and suggests that there were many more sheep than hueques. The decline of hueques reached a point in the late 18th century when only the Mapuche from Mariquina and Huequén next to Angol raised the animal.

=== United States ===
Llamas were first imported into the US in the late 1800s as zoo exhibits. Restrictions on importation of livestock from South America due to hoof and mouth disease, combined with lack of commercial interest, resulted in the number of llamas staying low until the late 20th century. In the 1970s, interest in llamas as livestock began to grow, and the number of llamas increased as farmers bred and produced an increasing number of animals. Both the price and number of llamas in the US climbed rapidly in the 1980s and 1990s. With little market for llama fiber or meat in the US and the value of guard llamas limited, the primary value in llamas was in breeding more animals, a classic sign of a speculative bubble in agriculture. By 2002, there were almost 145,000 llamas in the US, according to the US Department of Agriculture, and animals sold for as much as $220,000. However, the lack of any end market for the animals resulted in a crash in both llama prices and the number of llamas; the Great Recession further dried up investment capital, and the number of llamas in the US began to decline as fewer animals were bred and older animals died of old age. By 2017, the number of llamas in the US had dropped below 40,000. A similar speculative bubble was experienced with the closely related alpaca, which burst shortly after the llama bubble.

== Culture ==
Being an important animal and long-standing cultural icon in South America, Llamas gained in recent history cultural prominence in Western culture.

For example, the video game company Maxis has used llamas extensively as elements in their games, particularly in the widely popular game series The Sims, with llamas being the national symbol of the country where the broader series of Sim games are set. The online video game Fortnite uses piñata llamas as loot containers, which contain various in-game resources. Game developer Jeff Minter also named his company Llamasoft in honor of the animal.

The programming language Perl, with its Llama book, has been associated with llamas.

In The Emperor's New Groove, a 2000 animated Disney film, an Incan emperor gets turned into a llama.

== See also ==
- Alpaca
- Cama, a hybrid between a llama and a camel
- Grass Mud Horse, a parody originating from Mainland China in 2009 that features the alpaca and llama
- Guanaco
- Guard llama, llamas used as livestock guardians
- Lamoid
- Llama hiking
- Llamero
- Llamanaco
