= Rojo the Llama =

Therapy animal

Rojo
- Species: Llama
- Sex: Male
- Died: November 6, 2019
- Resting place: Washington School for the Blind
- Nationality: United States
- Occupation: Therapy animal
- Owner: Shannon Joy
- Residence: Mountain Peaks Therapy Llamas and Alpacas
- Named after: Red colouring

Rojo the Llama was a llama and therapy animal based in the Pacific Northwest region of the United States. His handler was Shannon Joy of Mountain Peaks Therapy Llamas and Alpacas, also known as the "Llama Mama". He was named after his red coloring ("rojo" means "red" in Spanish).

Rojo was a show animal in a 4-H program and entered Dove Lewis' Animal-Assisted Therapy Training program at the age of 5. He was the grand marshal of Portland's Junior Rose Festival in 2013, and appeared at the city's Grand Floral Parade in 2019. Joy raised more than $8,000 to publish a children's book about Rojo called Rojo, The Perfectly Imperfect Llama. In 2018, Joy and Rojo appeared at the Ilani Casino Resort to audition for the twentieth season of the reality television series Big Brother.

Rojo has been described as "Portland's most famous therapy animal". In 2019, after being a therapy animal for twelve years, Rojo retired and returned to his owner's Ridgefield, Washington farm. After experiencing declining health, Rojo died on the morning of November 6, 2019. His owners are having his body preserved and donated to the wildlife safari room at the Washington School for the Blind.
