= Llamero =

Indigenous llama herders

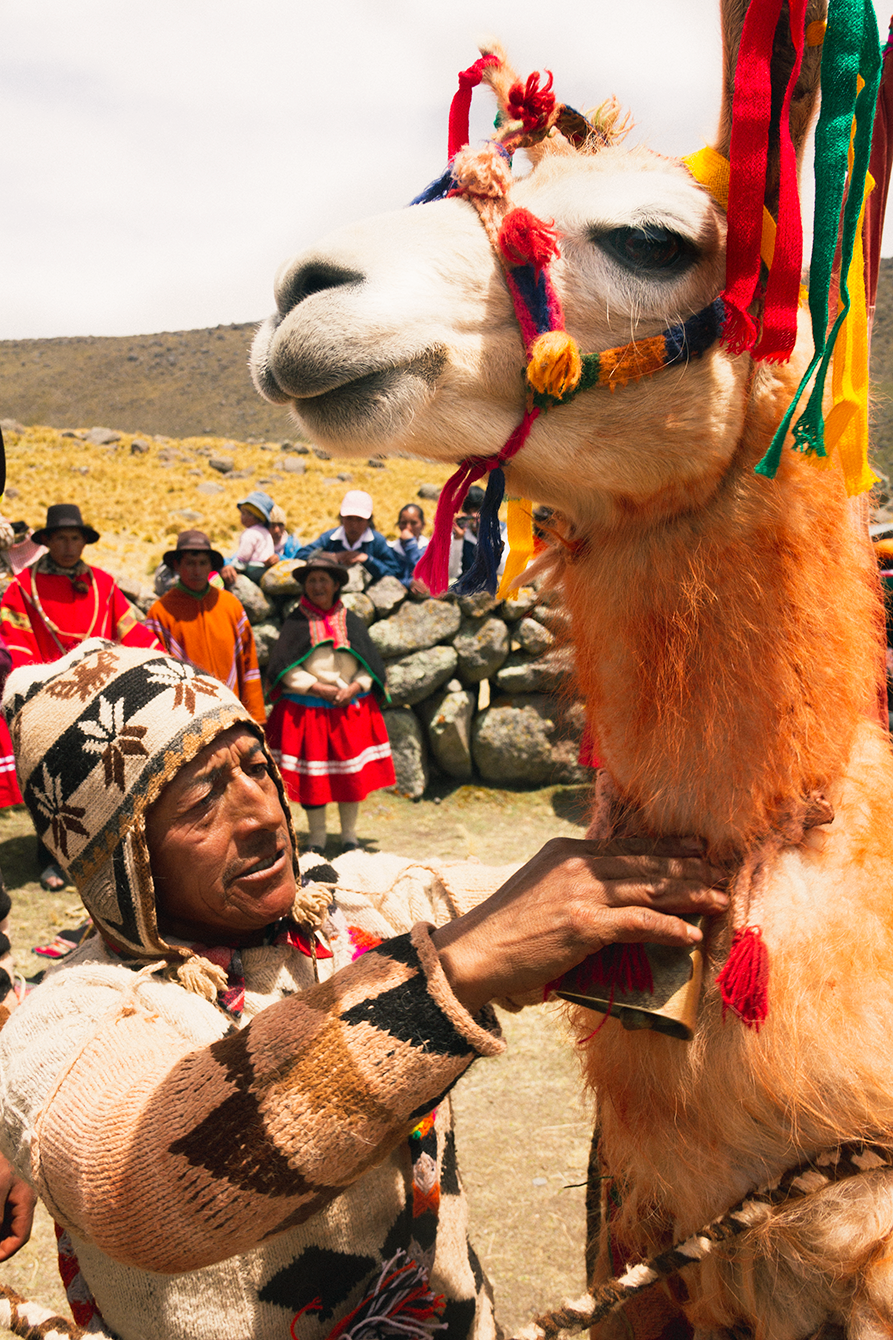
A llamero from Paucartambo, Peru, in 2023.

Llameros (lit. "people who drive llamas"; also known as pastores or caravaneros) are indigenous peasants who run llama caravans throughout the Andes of South America.

During the Inca Empire, llameros were high-ranking officials tasked with managing the emperor's llama and alpaca herds, and facilitating trade and communication throughout the empire. Nowadays, roads have reduced the need for llameros, and they now mostly serve isolated mountain villages inaccessible by road.

== History ==
Llama caravans have been historically used by Andean people for transport of goods and people. With the modernization of transport in Bolivia, as well as climatic and economic changes, llamas have been significantly replaced by motorized vehicles.

Llameros are usually fluent in Quechua and Spanish. They do not use money for the exchange of goods, instead relying on bartering alone. Some groups are composed of family members, including young boys and women.
