= Cria =

Baby camelid

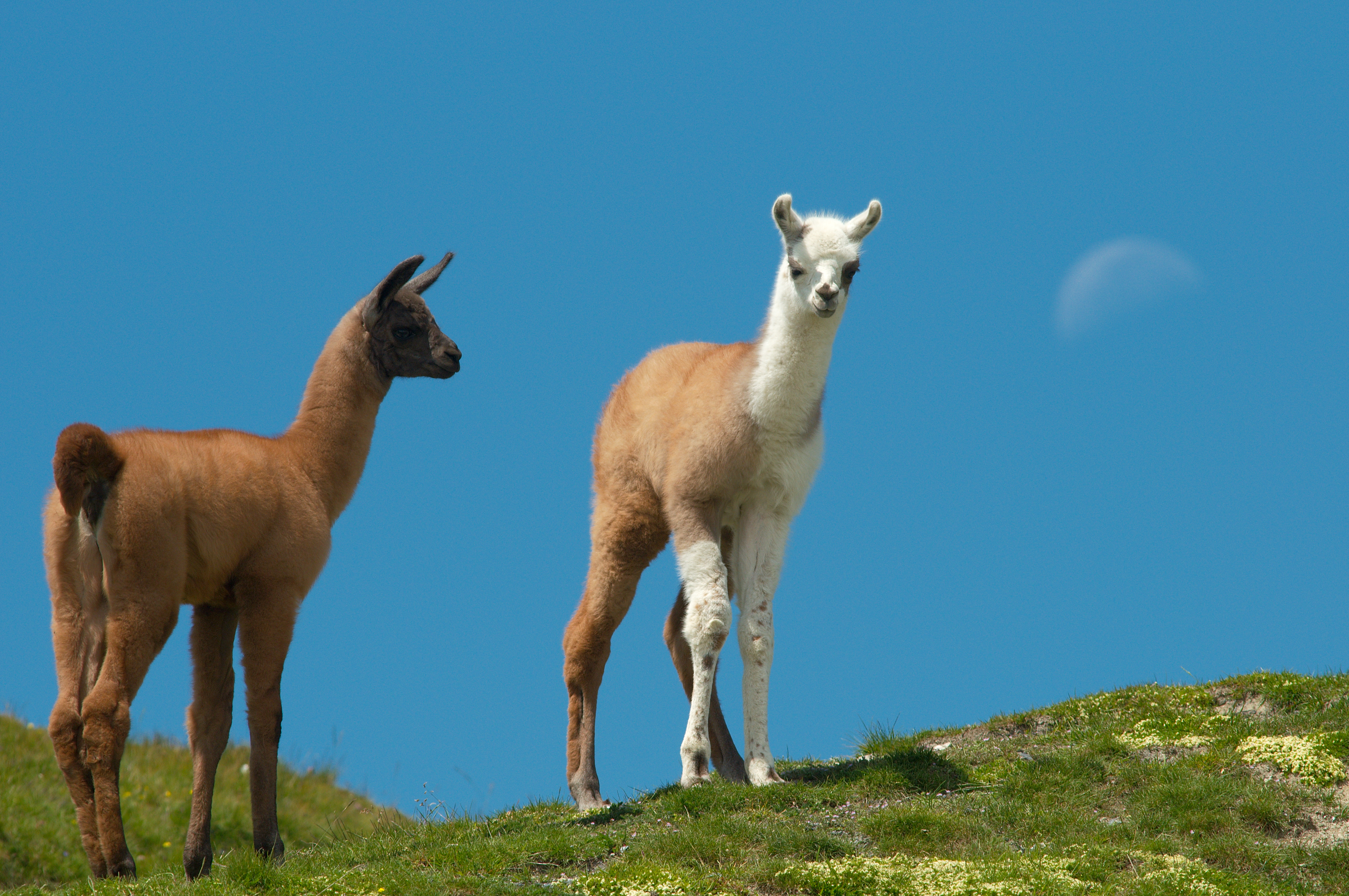

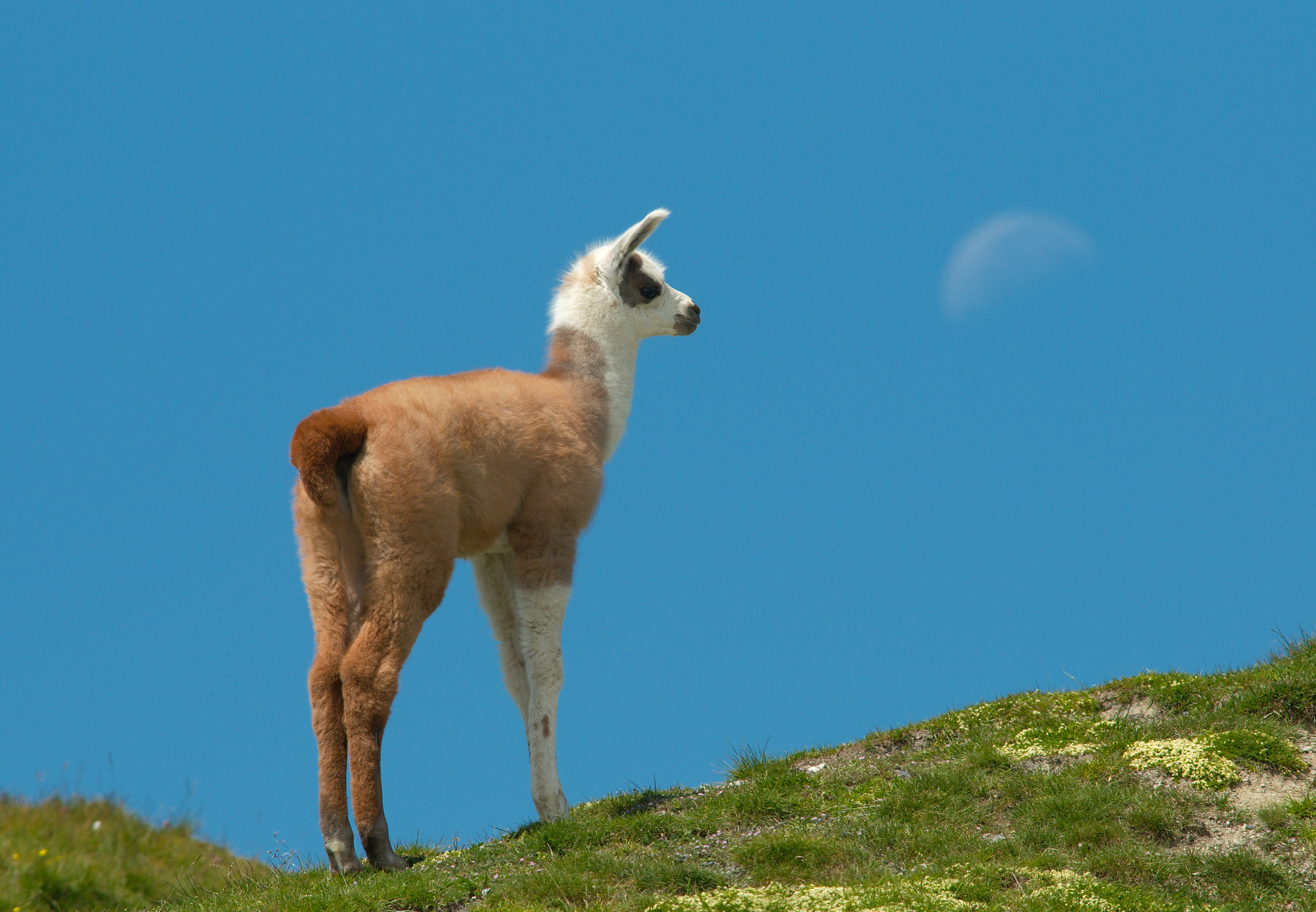
Llama cria

A cria (pronounced /ˈkriːə/) is a juvenile llama, alpaca, vicuña, or guanaco.

== Etymology ==
The term comes from the Spanish word cría, meaning "baby". Its false cognate in English, crya (pronounced /ˈkraɪə/), was coined by British sailors who explored Chile in the 18th century and were quick to describe the camelids onomatopoeically according to the mwa sound they made, which was not unlike that of a human crying baby.

== Alpaca crias ==
In alpacas, pregnancies last 11 to 12 months, and usually result in a single cria. Twins are rare, approximately 1/1000, slightly rarer than the proportion of twins in human births. Twin cria births are not only rare, but dangerous.

== Llama crias ==
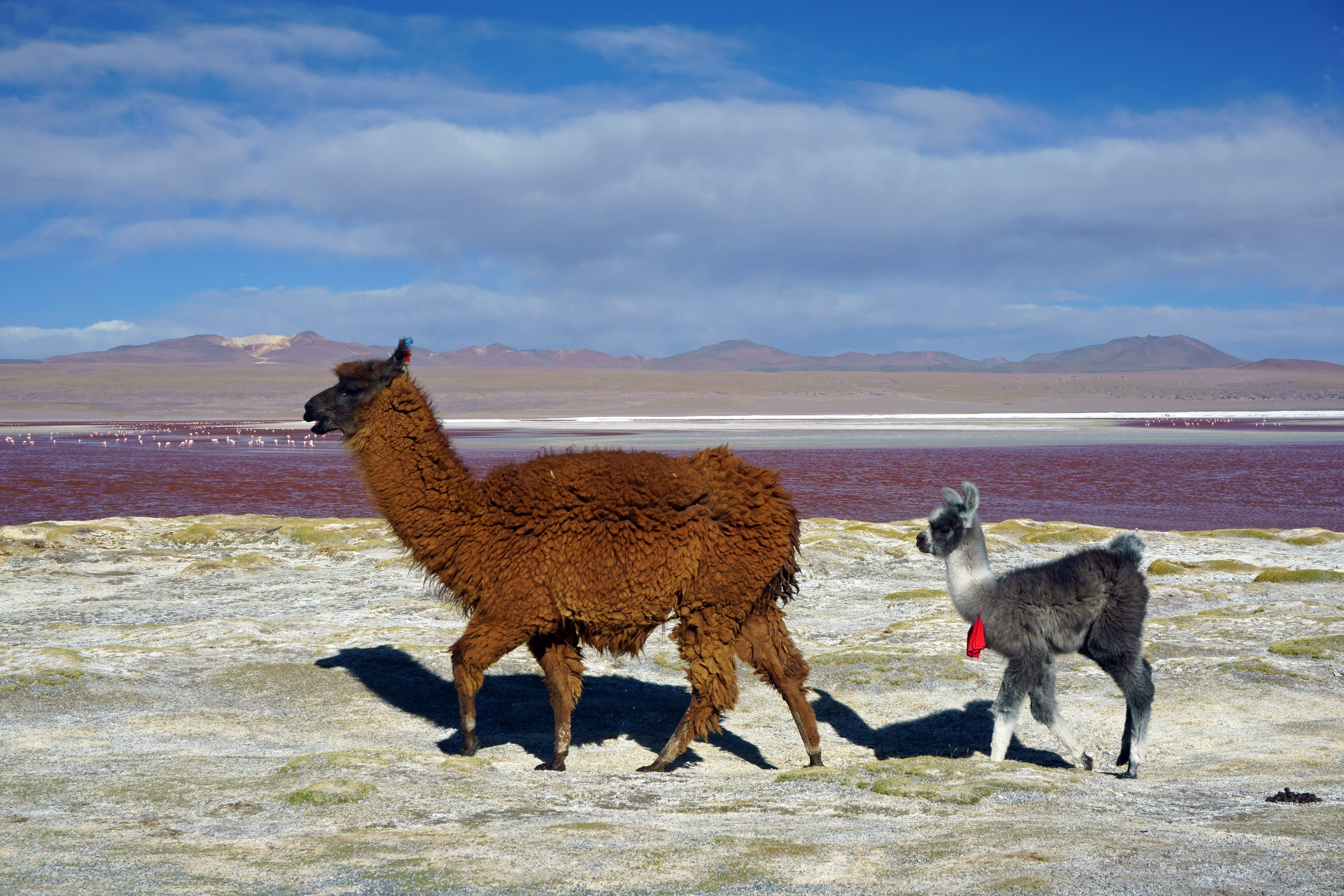
A female llama with her cria at Laguna Colorada, Bolivia.

Llama crias are typically born with the whole herd gathering around (only the females are present, as the males are considered a threat) in an attempt to protect against potential predators. Llamas give birth standing, and the process is usually relatively quick and problem-free, over in less than 30 minutes. Most births take place between 8 am and noon, during the relatively warmer daylight hours. This may increase cria survival by reducing fatalities due to hypothermia during cold Andean nights. While unproven, it is speculated that this birthing pattern is a continuation of the birthing patterns observed in the wild. Crias stand, walk, and attempt to nurse within the first hour after birth. Llama milk is lower in fat and salt and higher in phosphorus and calcium than cow or goat milk. A female llama will only produce about 60 ml (2 US fl oz) of milk at a time when she gives milk. For this reason, the cria must suckle frequently to receive the nutrients it requires.

== Vicuña crias ==
Mating usually occurs in March through May, and after a gestation period of about 11 months the female gives birth to a single cria, which is nursed for about 10 months. The cria becomes independent at about 12 to 18 months.

== Guanaco crias ==
Young guanacos are also known as chulengos. The guanaco has a gestation period of 11.5 months, with birth taking place in the summer months of November and December. Once a chulengo is born, it typically stands within 5 to 76 minutes. After a few weeks, the chulengo begins to graze. At eight months, the chulengo is almost fully weaned.

== Religious uses of crias ==
Incans often use dried cria carcasses to make payments to Pachamama. Used in ceremony, the crias are burned and the ashes are given as payments to the earth. In the markets of Cuzco, crias are sold for such purposes.
