= Knit picker =

Tool to remove snags from knitted fabrics

A knit picker is a fabric tool used to remove snags from knitted clothing and fabrics.

The knit picker resembles a smaller and finer loop turner. The end of the picker has a small hook to grab the snag or loose end, which can then be pulled through to the interior. The hook is very fine to ensure it gets under the snag.

== See also ==
- Seam ripper
