= Stretch fabric =

Fabric that can be stretched and recover

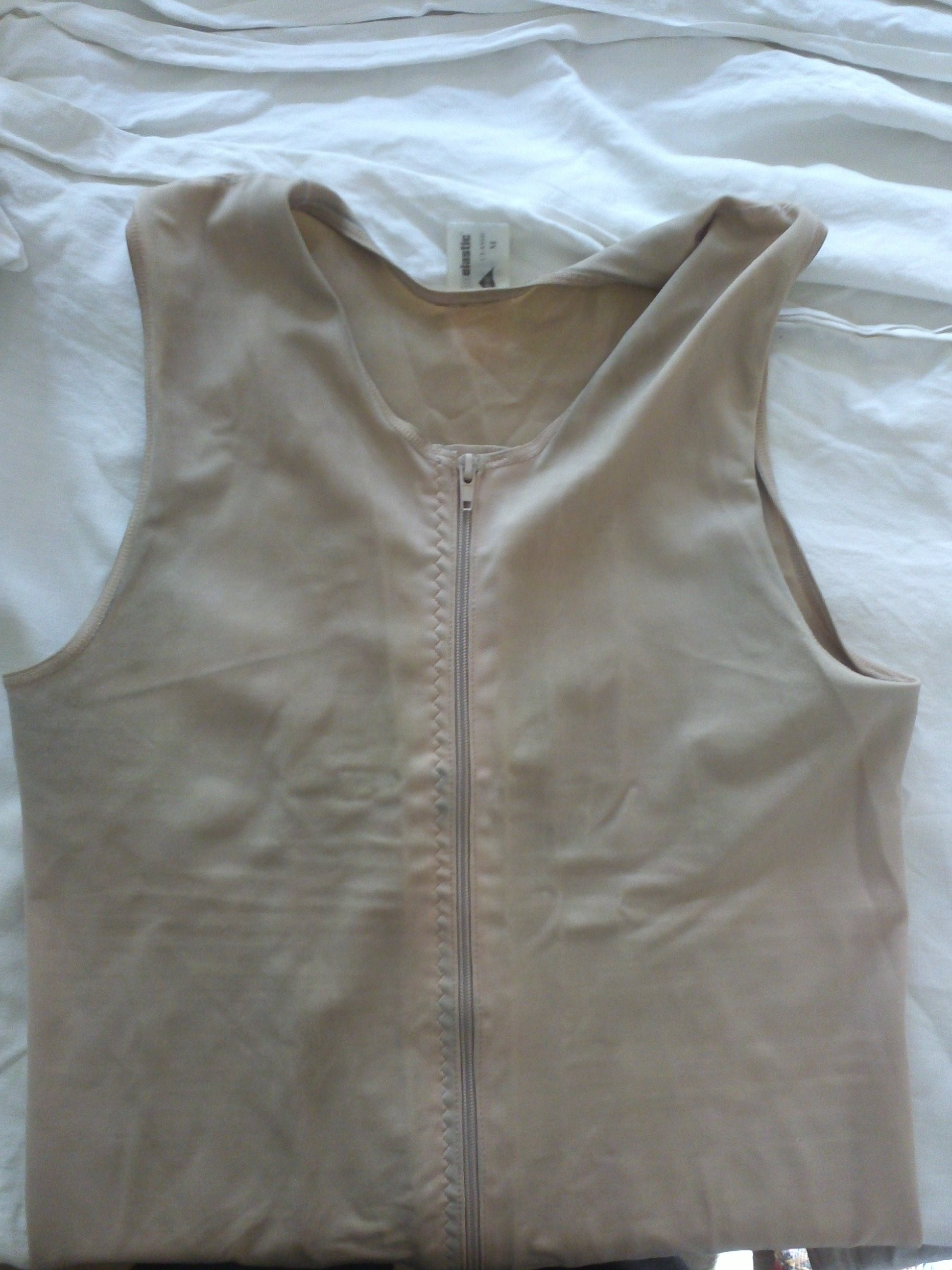
A lycra jacket

Stretch fabric is a synthetic fabric that stretches. Stretch fabrics are either 2-way stretch or 4-way stretch.

2-way stretch fabrics stretch in one direction, usually from selvedge to selvedge (but can be in other directions depending on the knit). 4-way stretch fabrics, such as spandex, stretch in both directions, crosswise and lengthwise. It is distinct from elastic which is not a fabric but a notion.

Stretch fabrics evolved from the scientific effort to make fibres using neoprene. From this research, in 1958, commercial stretch fabrics ("elastomerics") such as spandex or elastane (widely branded as "Lycra") were brought to the market.

Stretch fabrics simplify the construction of clothing. First used in swimsuits and women's bras, fashion designers began using them as early as the mid-1980s. They entered the mainstream market in the early 1990s and are widely used in sports clothing.

On a larger scale, the materials have also been adapted to many artistic and decorative purposes. Stretch fabric structures create contemporary-looking design elements that have many uses in corporate theatre and event production.
