= Compaction (textiles) =

Finishing process used to minimize shrinking in textiles

Compaction (compacting) is a finishing process used to minimize shrinking in textiles. Textile products that are loosely woven or knitted shrink more, whereas tightly knitted and woven products are more stable. The structure of knitted fabrics is competitively loose and flexible. Compaction, like sanforization for woven fabric, is intended to reduce shrinkage in tube and open width Knitted textiles.

== Compactor ==
A compactor is a textile finishing machine that is specifically designed for compaction. Compaction has a mechanism that shrinks the fabric forcibly in order to render it shrinkproof, preventing any residual shrinking in the applied fabric. The machine has two cylinders, the delivery cylinder moves faster than the take-off cylinder. Shrinkage in textiles is an undesirable property caused by fiber properties, fabric structure and elongations caused during prior treatments.

=== Components ===
A compactor machine is equipped with an entry, small tenter frame, steaming unit and a set of felt and rollers. It may have J Box or rolling at exit. There are Compactors with a metal shoe also (Reference: Tube-Tex.)

=== Functions ===
Compaction results in smoother surfaces, controlled twisting, and shrinkage of the fabric. Additionally it helps in adjusting width and the GSM of the fabric by manipulating fabric density.

== See also ==
- Calendering (textiles), a machine that produces surface effect on textiles.
- London shrunk
