= Crabbing (disambiguation) =

Crabbing is a term for crab fishing in general, or the specific act of crab lining by hand.

It may also refer to:

- Decatising, a process in textile production
- Deviation between bearing and direction of travel in an aircraft attempting a crosswind landing
- The action of crab cavities, rotating particle bunches in accelerators out of alignment with their direction of travel
