= Finishing (textiles) =

Manufacturing process

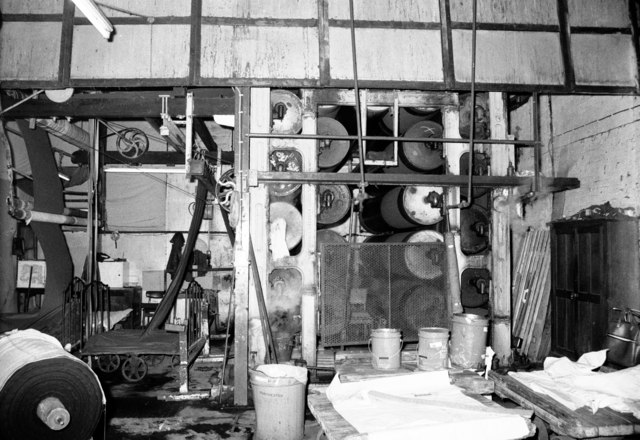
Textile finishing machinery, Red Bridge Mills, Ainsworth, 1983

In textile manufacturing, finishing refers to the processes that convert the woven or knitted cloth into a usable material and more specifically to any process performed after dyeing the yarn or fabric to improve the look, performance, or "hand" (feel) of the finish textile or clothing. The precise meaning depends on context.

Fabric after leaving the loom or knitting machine is not readily useable. Called greige cloth at this stage, it contains natural and added impurities. Sometimes it is also processed at fiber or yarn stages of textile manufacturing. Grey fiber or yarn or fabric goes through a series of processes such as wet processing and finishing. Finishing is a broad range of physical and chemical treatments that complete one stage of textile manufacturing and may prepare for the next step, making the product more receptive to the next stage of manufacturing. Finishing adds value to the product and makes it more attractive, useful, and functional for the end-user. Improving surface feel, aesthetics, and addition of advanced chemical finishes are some examples of textile finishing.

Some finishing techniques such as bleaching and dyeing are applied to yarn before it is woven while others are applied to the grey cloth directly after it is woven or knitted. Some finishing techniques, such as fulling, became outdated with the industrial revolution while others, such as mercerisation, are developments following the Industrial Revolution.

== Introduction ==
Textile finishing refers to a series of physical, chemical, or biological treatments applied to textiles (e.g., fabrics, yarns, fibers) after weaving or knitting. These processes enhance appearance, texture, performance, or add specialized functionalities to meet end-use requirements. As a critical step in textile production, finishing directly impacts product quality, functionality, and value, driving innovations in sustainable fashion and advanced manufacturing.

In order to impart the required functional properties to the fiber or fabric, it is customary to subject the material to different types of physical and chemical treatments. For example, wash and wear finish for a cotton fabric is necessary to make it crease-free or wrinkle-free. In a similar way, mercerising, singeing, flame retardant, water repellent, waterproof, anti-static and peach finishing achieve various fabric properties desired by consumers.

The use of 100% synthetic textiles has increased considerably since the development of textured yarns made of filaments and the growing production of knit goods. The use of open weave has enabled the production of lighter, breathable, fabrics to ensure better wearing comfort.

The properties of petroleum-based synthetic fibers, most important among them being polyamide, polyester and polyacrylonitrile, are essentially different from those of natural cellulosic and protein-based (wool) fibers. Hence the sequence of finishing operations is likely to be different. While cellulosic fabrics require a resin finishing treatment to impart easy-care properties, synthetic fibers already exhibit these easy-care criteria and require only a heat setting operation.

== Finishing of cotton ==
=== Purification and preliminary processes ===
The greige cloth—woven cotton fabric in its loom-state—not only contains impurities, including warp size, but requires further treatment in order to develop its full textile potential. Furthermore, it may receive considerable added value by applying one or more finishing processes.

=== Singeing ===
Singeing is a preparation method of textiles; it is applied more commonly to woven textiles and cotton yarns. Singeing in textiles is a mechanical treatment or finish to obtain a neat surface of the fabric or less hairy yarn. In a singeing machine, the yarns or fabrics are exposed to direct flames to burn the protruding fibers of the textile materials. Hence, also called "gassing".The singeing machine can smooth the fabric surface, thereby improving the quality of the dyeing/printing process and reducing pilling.

=== Desizing ===
Depending on the size that has been used, the cloth may be steeped in a dilute acid and then rinsed, or enzymes may be used to break down the size.

=== Scouring ===
Scouring is a chemical washing process carried out on cotton fabric to remove natural wax and non-fibrous impurities (e.g. the remains of seed fragments) from the fibres and any adventitious oil, soiling or dirt. Scouring was used to carry in iron vessels called kiers. The fabric was boiled in an alkali, which forms a soap with free fatty acids (saponification). A kier is usually enclosed, so the solution of sodium hydroxide can be boiled under pressure, excluding oxygen which would degrade the cellulose in the fibre. If the appropriate reagents are used, scouring will also remove size from the fabric although desizing often precedes scouring and is considered to be a separate process known as fabric preparation. Preparation and scouring are prerequisites to most of the other finishing processes. At this stage even the most naturally white cotton fibres are yellowish, and bleaching, the next process, is required.

=== Bleaching ===
Bleaching improves whiteness by removing natural coloration and remaining trace impurities from the cotton; the degree of bleaching necessary is determined by the required whiteness and absorbency. Cotton being a vegetable fibre will be bleached using an oxidizing agent, such as dilute sodium hypochlorite or dilute hydrogen peroxide. If the fabric is to be dyed a deep shade, then lower levels of bleaching are acceptable, for example. However, for white bed sheetings and medical applications, the highest levels of whiteness and absorbency are essential.

=== Mercerising ===
A further possibility is mercerizing, during which the fabric is treated with a caustic soda solution to cause swelling of the fibres. This results in improved luster, strength, and dye affinity. Cotton is mercerized under tension, and all alkali must be washed out before the tension is released or shrinkage will take place. Mercerizing can take place directly on grey cloth, or after bleaching.

=== Coloration ===
Color is a sensation caused when white light from a source such as the sun is reflected off a pigment on the surface. The pigment selectively reflects certain wavelengths of light while absorbing others. A dye can be considered as a substance that can be fixed to a material that has these properties. The colour it reflects is defined by the structure of the molecule, and particularly the parts of the chromogen molecule called the chromophore group. There are two processes used to apply colour:

==== Dyeing ====
Cotton is an absorbent fibre which responds readily to colouration processes. Dyeing is commonly carried out with an anionic direct dye by completely immersing the fabric (or yarn) in an aqueous dyebath according to a prescribed procedure. For improved fastness to washing, rubbing, and light, other dyes such as vats and reactives are commonly used. These require more complex chemistry during processing and are thus more expensive to apply.

==== Printing ====
Printing is the application of colour in the form of a paste or ink to the surface of a fabric, in a predetermined pattern. It may be considered as localised dyeing. Printing designs on to already dyed fabric is also possible. The common processes are block printing, roller printing and screen printing

=== Finishing ===
==== Mechanical finishing ====
Mechanical finish refers to machine finishes such as embossing, heat setting, sanforizing, sheering, various, luster imparting, surface finishes, and glaze finishes.

Mechanical Finishes
Raised surface finishes	Luster imparting	Glaze and design
Gigging	Calendering	Embossing
Napping	Beetling	Moire
Sueding		
Flocking		

===== Raising =====
Another finishing process is raising. During raising, the fabric surface is treated with sharp teeth to lift the surface fibres, thereby imparting hairiness, softness, and warmth, as in flannelette.

==== Shearing ====
Shearing is a kind of mechanical finish in which the appearance of the fabric is enhanced by cutting the loops or raised surface to a uniform and even height. The machine may have a spiral blade similar to a grass cutting machine. A Shearing machine can cut the loop or the pile to a desired level.

===== Peaching =====
Peaching is also a mechanical finish comparable to raising but very gentle. The peach effect on fabrics is obtained by sanding the fabrics slightly; it imparts a protruded surface and soft feel. The peaching finish is also possible with certain chemicals or laundry abrasion.

===== Calendering =====
Calendering is the third important mechanical process, in which the fabric is passed between heated rollers to generate smooth, polished or embossed effects depending on roller surface properties and relative speeds.

==== Chemical finishing ====
Many other chemical treatments may be applied to cotton fabrics to produce low flammability, crease resist and other special effects.

==== Shrinking ====
Mechanical shrinking (sometimes referred to as sanforizing), whereby the fabric is forced to shrink width and/or lengthwise, creates a fabric in which any residual tendency to shrink after subsequent laundering is minimal. Fibers to fabric conversion lead to many mechanical tensions and forces during manufacturing, which includes following steps for fibre to yarn conversion with spinning then fabric with weaving, and knitting. When the products are immersed in water, the water acts as a relaxing medium and all stresses and strains get relaxed and try to come back to its original relaxed state. Even after finishing with sophisticated finishing machines, some residual shrinkage remains, which is carried forward to the garment stage. This residual shrinkage may cause deformity or de-shaping of the products after domestic laundry. There are certain acceptance limits of shrinkage levels for every product. Abnormal shrinkage levels are considered a non-conformity to quality standards.

== Standard finishes ==
=== Quality-oriented ===
- Calendering
- Decatising
- Desizing for woven fabrics.
- Pressing
- Scouring with detergents, alkaline solutions, or enzymes removes foreign matter.
- Shrinking, Sanforization
- Shearing or singeing smooths the fabric by removing the fine protruding fibers on the surface of the fabric. Flame singeing is the standard process: the wet fabric is passed through an array of gas burners at a suitable distance to burn the pills off of its surface.

=== Design-oriented ===
- Bleaching of woven fabrics removes any prior color in order to obtain a uniform color during the dying process.
- Dyeing adds color.
- Printing adds color and pattern.
- Watering adds moiré patterns.

=== Handle-oriented ===
- Fulling or waulking increases weight per unit area, (density).
- Hydrophobic finishing with a durable water repellent produces a fabric with reduced water based staining.
- Weighting silk with metallic salts or polymer adds weight and improves handle.

== Special finishes for natural fibers ==
- Bio-polishing removes the protruding fibers of fabric with the action of an enzyme. Enzymes, such as cellulase for cotton, selectively remove protruding fibers. These enzymes may be deactivated by an increase in temperature and shifting pH.
- Mercerisation makes the woven cotton fabric stronger, more lustrous, and less abrasive, and improves its dye affinity.
- Raising lifts the surface fibers to improve the softness and warmth, as in flannelette.
- Peach Finish subjects the fabric (either cotton or its synthetic blends) to emery wheels, making the surface velvet-like. This is a special finish used mostly in garments.
- Fulling or waulking was a method of thickening woolen material to make it more water-resistant.
- Decatising to bring dimension stability to woollen fabrics.
- Calendering makes one or both surfaces of the fabric smooth and shiny. The fabric is passed to through hot, fast-moving stainless steel cylinders.
- Compacting it is the advance version of the calendering machine and suitable for knitted fabric to achieve desired gsm and to set width, for calendering and shrinkages control simultaneously. The compactors machines comes in both tube and open width settings.
- Sanforizing or pre-shrinking prevents a fabric and the produced garment from shrinking after production. This is also a mechanical finish, acquired by feeding the fabric between a roller and rubber blanket, in such a way the rubber blanket compresses the weft threads and imparts compressive shrinkage.
- Crease-resist finish or "wash-and-wear" or "wrinkle-free" finishes are achieved by the addition of a chemical resin finish that makes the fiber take on a quality similar to that of synthetic fibers.
- Anti-microbial finish causes the fabric to inhibit the growth of microbes. The humid and warm environment found in textile fibers encourages the growth of the microbes. Infestation by microbes can cause cross-infection by pathogens and the development of odor where the fabric is worn next to the skin. In addition, stains and loss of fiber quality of textile substrates can also take place. With an aim to protect the skin of the wearer and the textile substrate itself, an anti-microbial finish is applied to textile materials.
- Antiviral finishes on textiles are a further exploitation of using antimicrobial surfaces that are applicable to both natural and synthetic textiles. Exhibiting antiviral properties, these surfaces may inactivate the lipid coated viruses.
- Self cleaning surface finish on cellulosic materials like cotton, treated materials clean themselves of stains and remove odors when exposed to sunlight. The fabric is coated with N-TiO_{2} film and lAgI particles.

== Special finishes for synthetic fibers ==
- Heat-setting of synthetic fabrics eliminates the internal tensions within the fiber, generated during manufacturing, and the new state can be fixed by rapid cooling. This heat setting fixes the fabrics in the relaxed state, and thus avoids subsequent shrinkage or creasing of the fabric. Presetting of goods makes it possible to use higher temperatures for setting without considering the sublimation properties of dyes and also has a favorable effect on dyeing behavior and the running properties of the fabric. On the other hand, post-setting can be combined with some other operations such as Thermasol dyeing or optical brightening of polyester. Post-setting as a final finish is useful to achieve high dimensional stability, along with the desired handle. Post heat setting may cause poor wash fastness in disperse dyed fabrics because of sublimation. Heat-setting is an important part of finishing synthetic or blended fabrics.
- Stiffening and filling process: A stiffening effect is desirable in certain polyamides and polyester materials (e.g. petticoats, collar inner linings), which can be done by reducing the mutual independence of structural elements of fabric by polymer deposition on coating as a fine film.
- Hydrophilic finishes compensate for lower moisture and water absorption capacity in synthetic fiber materials, which become uncomfortable in contact with skin. Certain products, based on modified (oxy-ethylated) polyamides, make the fabric more pleasant by reducing the cohesion of water so that it spreads over a larger area and thus evaporates more readily.
- Anti-pilling finish alleviates pilling, an unpleasant phenomenon associated with spun yarn fabrics, especially when they contain synthetics. Synthetic fibers are more readily brought to the surface of fabric due to their smooth surface and circular cross-section, and due to their higher tensile strength and abrasion resistance. With knit "picking" also occurs: by abrasion, individual fibers work themselves out of yarn loops onto the surface, and the garment catches on a pointed or rough object. Knitting is susceptible to these effects due to the open weave and bulky yarn.
- Anti-static finish prevents dust from clinging to the fabric. Anti-static effective chemicals are largely chemically inert and require Thermasol or heat treatment for fixing on polyester fabrics. Polyether agents have been found to be useful but should not affect the dye-equilibrium on fiber, lest they impair the rubbing fastness. In general, Thermasol anti-static agents also have a good soil release action, which is as permanent as the anti-static effect. Anti-static finishes may also be of polyamide type, being curable at moderate temperatures.
- Non-slip finishes give the filaments a rougher surface. Synthetic warp and weft threads in loosely woven fabrics are particularly prone to slip because of their surface smoothness when the structure of the fabric is disturbed and appearance is no longer attractive. Silica gel dispersions or silicic acid colloidal solutions are used in combination with latex polymer or acrylates dispersions to get a more permanent effect, along with simultaneous improvement in resistance to pilling or snagging. These polymer finishes are also capable of imparting a soft and smooth handle to synthetic fabric without making it water repellent.
- Fire-resistant or flame-retardant finish reduces flammability.
- Anti-microbial finish: with the increasing use of synthetic fibers for carpets and other materials in public places, anti-microbial finishes have gained importance. Products that are commonly applied are brominated phenols, quaternary ammonium compounds, organo-silver, and tin compounds, which can be applied as solutions or dispersions. They can also be incorporated in a polymeric film deposited on the surface to achieve a controlled release.

== See also ==
- Wet processing engineering
- Textile manufacturing
- Silk surfacing
- Plasma treatment (textiles)
- London shrunk
- Antimicrobial textile finishes

== Biography ==
- Collier, Ann M (1970), A Handbook of Textiles, Pergamon Press, p. 258, ISBN 0-08-018057-4
- Kadolph, Sara J (2007). Textiles (10 ed.). Pearson/Prentice-Hall. ISBN 978-0-13-118769-6.
- Textil-Praxis (1958), 401 - „Befeuchtung oder Dämpfen von Wollgarnen”
- Textilbetrieb (1981), 29 - „Gleichmäßige Effekte beim Garndämpfen“
- Dr. H.-J. Henning, Dr.-Ing. Cl. Sustmann - Melliand Textilberichte „Untersuchungen über das Vakuumdämpfen von Wollgarnen“ (1966), 530
- Jens Holm Dittrich, Paul Naefe, Johann Kreitz - Melliand Textilberichte „Verfahren zur Drallberuhigung von Wollgarnen durch Kurzzeitdämpfen“ (1986), 817
