= Snag =

Snag may refer to:

== Places ==
- Snag, Yukon

== Other uses ==
- Snag (ecology), a standing dead tree or a tree, or a branch of a tree, fixed in the bottom of navigable water, that may be a hazard to navigation

- Snag forest, a recovery stage of natural forest

- Snag (textiles), a fiber pulled from in normal pattern in a fabric
- Snag (website), an online staffing platform specializing in hourly work
- SnaG, the Seachtain na Gaeilge celebrations
- Snag, a sausage in Australian English
- Snag list, or punch list, prepared near the end of a construction project listing work not conforming to contract specifications that the contractor must complete
- Snagging, snag fishing
- Snagging, another word for shredding trees
