= Siegel's Department Store =

- U.S. National Register of Historic Places
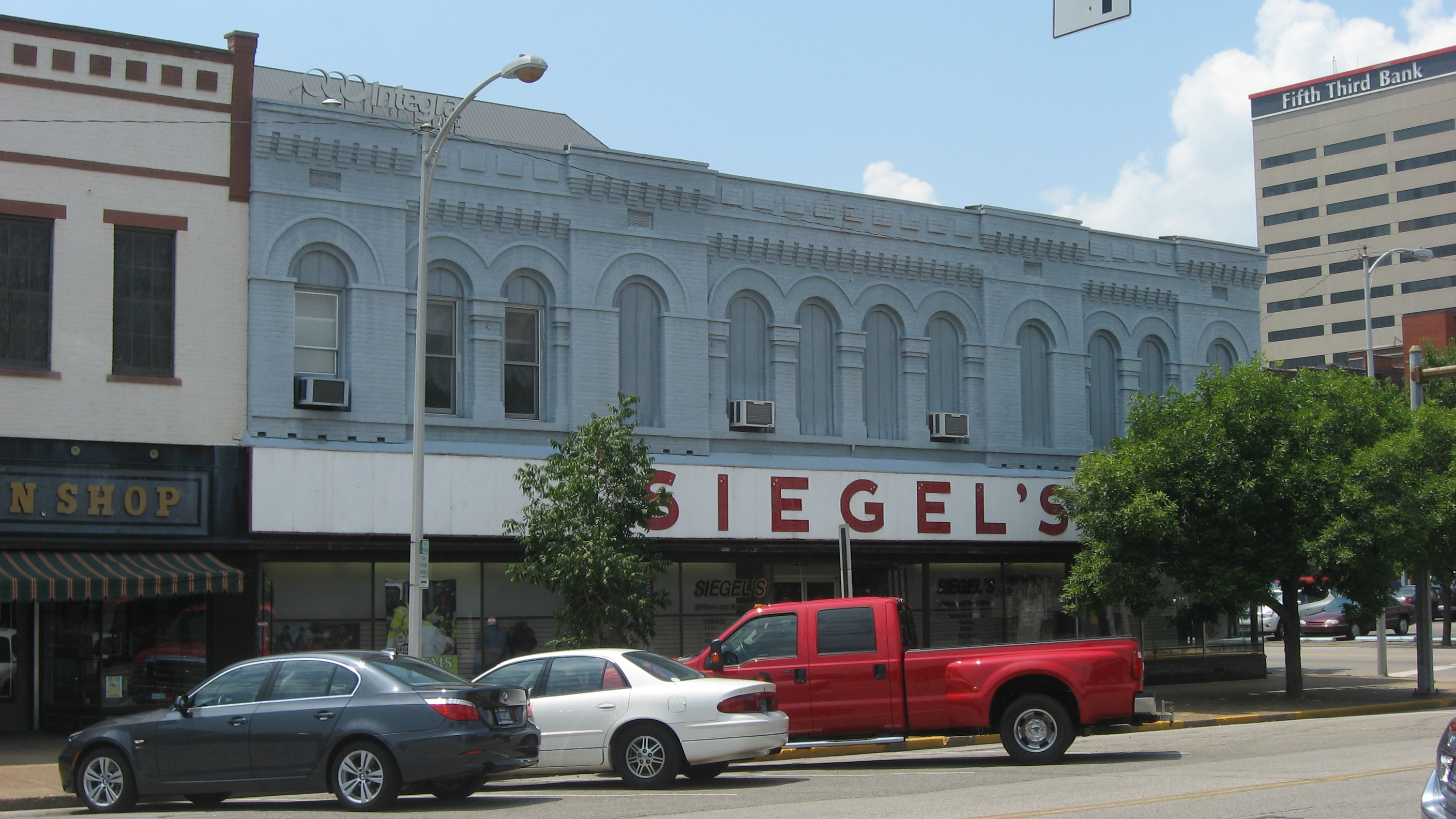

- Location within Indiana Location within the United States
- Location: 101-105 SE 4th St., Evansville, Indiana
- Coordinates: 37°58′14″N 87°34′14″W
- Area: less than one acre
- Built: 1902
- Architectural style: Romanesque Revival
- MPS: Downtown Evansville MRA
- NRHP reference No.: 82000122
- Added to NRHP: July 4, 1982

Siegel's Department Store is a historic commercial building located in downtown Evansville, Indiana. It was built in 1902, and is a two-story, Romanesque Revival style brick building. The building was originally built to house a haberdashery.

It was listed on the National Register of Historic Places in 1982.
