= Blowing =

Blowing may refer to:

- Air
- Breath
- Blowing by a whale, from blowhole (anatomy)
- Slang for fellating another

== Industrial processes ==
- Blowing (glassmaking)
- Blowing (textile finishing)
- Dry blowing, method to extract gold particles from dry soil without the use of water
- Melt blowing, fabrication method of micro-and nanofibers through extrusion

== Other ==
- Blowing (album), Japanese-language album by Tokio
