= Notions (sewing) =

Small accessories such as buttons used in sewing

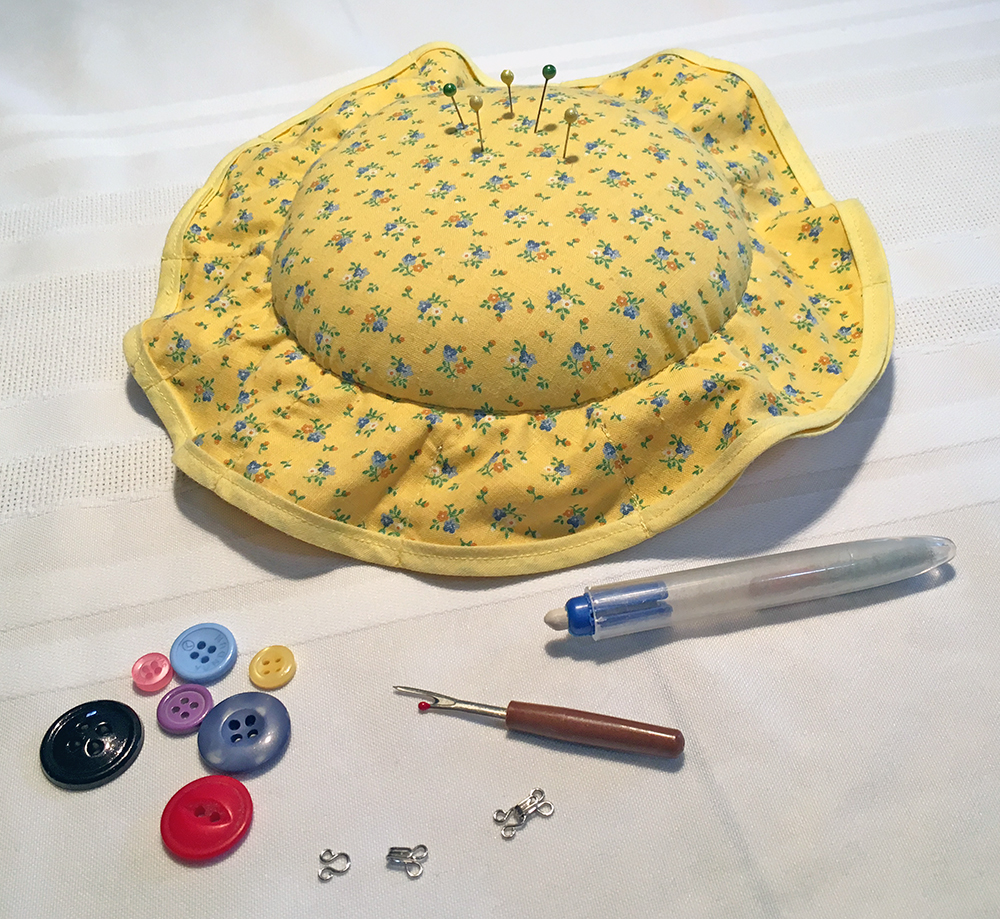
Some sewing notions: a pin cushion, pins, buttons, hooks and eyes, seam ripper, and sewing chalk

In sewing and haberdashery, notions are small objects or accessories, including items that are sewn or otherwise attached to a finished article, such as buttons, snaps, and collar stays. Notions also include the small tools used in sewing, such as needles, thread, pins, marking pens, elastic, and seam rippers. The noun is almost always used in the plural. The term is chiefly in American English (the equivalent British term is haberdashery). It was also formerly used in the phrase "Yankee notions", meaning American products. A fabric store will have a section or department devoted to notions, and a spool of thread is considered a notion.

== History ==
=== Origins ===
The roots of notions trace back around 25,000 years to the discovery of bone needles, a crucial tool in stitching garments made from fur. These early sewers also utilized thimbles to guard against occasional finger pricks, as evidenced by ancient artifacts. The emergence of buttons and buttonholes in Europe occurred during the European Crusades, as Christian armies encountered novel practices in faraway regions. The landscape of sewing changed with the introduction of machine-made cotton thread in England, approximately 500 years after the Crusades.

=== 1700s ===
The first sewing needle factory opened in Germany in 1730, and the first mechanical needle was manufactured 25 years later.

=== 1800s ===
Notions continued to evolve with the prominence of brass buttons as fasteners during the War of 1812, spurred by the establishment of the Waterbury Button Company. The subsequent development of twisted cotton thread set the stage for the midcentury invention of the sewing machine. In 1851, Isaac Singer set up what became the Singer sewing machine empire. Today, antique sewing tools attract collectors.

== As traffic generators in early department stores ==
Around 1900, the typical U.S. department store notions department consisted primarily of lace, trimmings, and sewing accessories. It was considered a seasonal business and received little attention. But some stores added accessories to their notions department, which they relocated to the ground floor. Accessories and notions had low price points, low margin, but high volume, and attracted casual shoppers in for a quick purchase. In a 1967 U.S. study, about half of all people in downtown stores bought something in the notions department and 84% of them went on to other departments, of whom almost half bought something else. The quick impulse buy in the notions department "softened up" the shopper and made them more open psychologically to buying things in other parts of the store. Still today, accessories such as costume jewelry and sunglasses are (as well as cosmetics and fragrances) usually placed close to main floor store entrances.
