= Greige goods =

Woven or knitted fabrics which are not yet dyed or finished

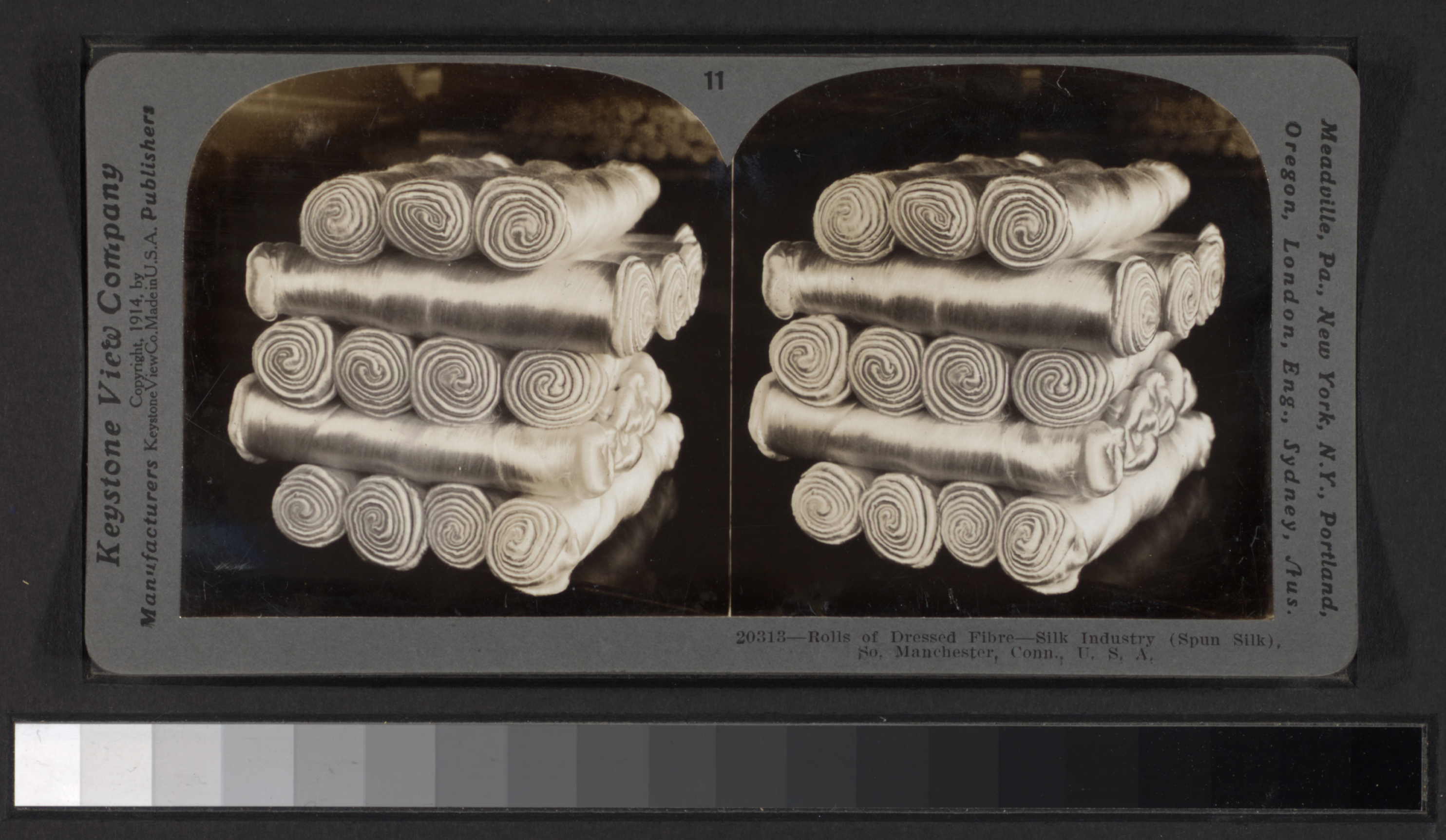
Silk rolls

Greige goods (Gray goods, Grey goods, Corah or korā) are loom state woven fabrics, or unprocessed knitted fabrics. Greige goods undergo many subsequent processes, for instance, dyeing, printing, bleaching, and finishing, prior to further converting to finished goods such as clothing, or other textile products. "Grey fabrics" is another term to refer to unfinished woven or knitted fabrics.

"Corah silk" was a type of light silk from India in the 19th century. It was a pale straw-colored material made from unbleached (raw) silk.

== Characteristics ==
Greige goods do not mean their color but their unprocessed form; they are sometimes called grey. Greige goods are unfinished fabrics that come directly from a loom or a knitting machine. Woven materials are also called ''loom state fabrics''. Greige materials are scoured (to clean) and sometimes bleached (to remove natural color) before dyeing and printing.

Greige goods contain many types of impurities.

=== Impurities ===
Foreign matter in addition to the actual fiber is known as impurities. Textile fibers contain the following types of impurities.

- Natural impurities: Impurities gathered from the natural environment by the fibres. Natural impurities also include non-fibrous parts that are incorporated into the fiber during its growth. Notably, these are not present in synthetic fibres, which are manufactured artificially.
- Added: Oils and waxes during spinning or knitting or weaving.
- Accidental: dirt or mishandling, foreign contaminants.

The impurities in different natural fibers
Fiber type	Typical impurity	Source
Cotton	10%	
Wool	40-50%	
Silk	22-30%	

Major cotton impurities
Type of impurity	Prevalence
Pectins	0.4-1.2%
Wax	0.4-1.2%
Others	1.7%

Other impurities in cotton may include proteins, mineral compounds and ash, among others.

Wool impurities
Type of impurity	In Merino	In crossbreed
Dirt or soil	19%	8%
Grease	16%	11%
Suint	6%	8%

==== Impurities in silk ====
Silk is an animal fiber. It consists of 70–80% fibroin and 20–30% sericin (the gum coating the fibres). It carries impurities like dirt, oils, fats and sericin.

=== Natural color ===
Most natural fibers have natural color, the natural color of the cotton cloth is off-white or beige when it is undyed or not processed. Because of the presence of natural pigment, wool has a slight yellow tint, though the color is undesirable and is removed during the pre-treatment processes of scouring and bleaching.

==== Fugitive tint ====
The tint is an application of very light dyes, or colorants, the fugitive (temporary) tint is used to identify and distinguish different batches. The fugitive tint is readily removable during subsequent wet processing treatments. The practice is common with synthetic textile materials.

== Parameters ==
Textile manufacturing is a complicated and lengthy procedure. The material passes through various stages. It is necessary to decide the yarn count, stitch length, thread count, and g.s.m. at the beginning, i.e., the greige stage, to achieve a desired finished product. Since the textile industry still works in a fragmented way, the greige goods are also sold for further processing at different units. They are then stitched together for subsequent operations.

== RFD fabrics ==
The semifinished state of fabrics that have been scoured or bleached in preparation for subsequent processes such as dyeing and printing is referred to as RFD (ready for dyeing). PFD stands for "prepared for dyeing," while PFP stands for "prepared for printing.". RFD multifiber that is composed of various fibers is used in testing of washing fastness for cross staining. It's known as "adjacent fabric."

== See also ==
- Textile
- Piece goods
- Batch production
- Bolt (cloth)
- Lot number
- Scouring (textiles)
- Quality control
