= London shrunk =

Textile finishing method for wool fabrics

The London shrunk, or London shrinkage, process was an 18th-century textile finishing process designed to preshrink wool fabrics and minimize their tendency to shrink before being used for making garments. When compared to the traditional steam shrinking method of controlling shrinkage, London shrinking provided more permanent results in terms of reducing the likelihood of fabric shrinkage. London shrunk was found to be effective for fine worsteds, it was not typically used for woolens.

The term London shrunk originated from London's garment industry. The practice of London shrinking was alternatively known as sponging.

== Shrinkage resistance and preshrink ==
Glossary: shrinkage resistance and residual shrinkage

Shrinkage resistance is the ability of a fabric to retain its original dimensions throughout care. It is related to the fabric's reaction to moisture or heat. Items that shrink may no longer be attractive or suitable for their original end use. Residual shrinkage refers to additional shrinkage that may occur after the first care cycle.

— Textiles by Kadolph, Sara J

Preshrinking is a process in which fabric is intentionally shrunk before it is cut and sewn into a garment or other textile product. Manufacturers use the term "pre-shrunk" to describe fabric or garments that have undergone processing, which is expected to limit shrinkage to less than 3% in either direction during standard wash tests or laundering. Woolen fabrics have a natural tendency to shrink, which can lead to deformation in the final garments. To prevent this, the London shrunk process was applied to specific woolen materials, resulting in fabrics with enhanced dimensional stability and improved resistance to shrinkage.

== Method ==
The London shrunk method involves a three-step process where the fabric undergoes dampening, drying, and pressing. The method includes layering the fabric between moist blankets and adding weight for 12 hours. Subsequently, the fabric is dried without any tension and pressed during the final stage.

The principal objective of this technique was to pre-shrink the fabric and eliminate any tension or strain that could have arisen during manufacturing.

=== Alternative method (steaming) ===
Steaming is a cheaper alternative to make clothes preshrunk, however, it is not as effective as London shrinking. The method has American origin. In the steaming method, the cloth bolt is wound around a perforated roller, steamed for approximately 80 minutes, and then left to air dry.

== Advantages and disadvantages ==
=== Advantages ===
The London shrunk process was used to improve the hand feel of processed fabrics, resulting in a refined texture and an overall improvement in quality. Garments made from London shrunk materials had more stable shapes than those made using normal steam shrinking methods. This resulted in a reduced need for ironing, as steam-shrunk garments typically required ironing twice a week, while London shrunk garments could go for several weeks without needing ironing. This was because London shrunk materials were already shrunk and thus retained their shape, making them more resistant to wrinkles. Steam-shrunk fabrics can shrink again with wear, causing them to lose their original dimensions and shape. It provides uniform shrinking of the fabric compared to the steaming method, where the inner and outer layers receive non-uniform steam and shrinking.

=== Disadvantages ===
London shrunk fabric requires longer processing time and more handling during the finishing process, which also results in additional costs. The cost of implementing the London shrinkage method was three times higher than that of the regular steam shrinking method.

== See also ==
- Calendering (textiles)
- Compaction (textiles)
- Stenter
- Textile manufacturing by pre-industrial methods
