= Textile bleaching =

Textile wet process that improves whiteness by removing natural color

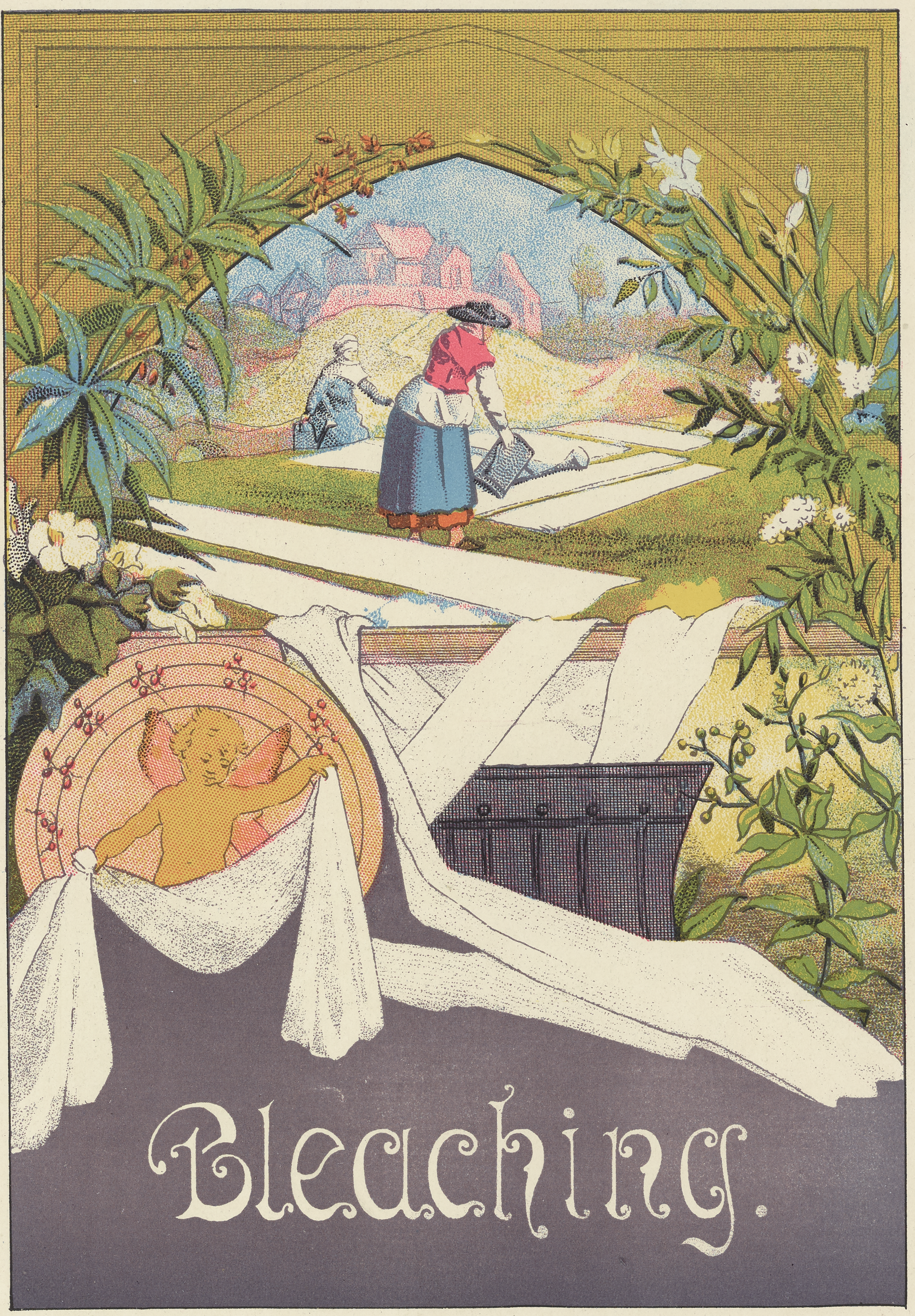
Early method of bleaching cotton and linen goods on lawns

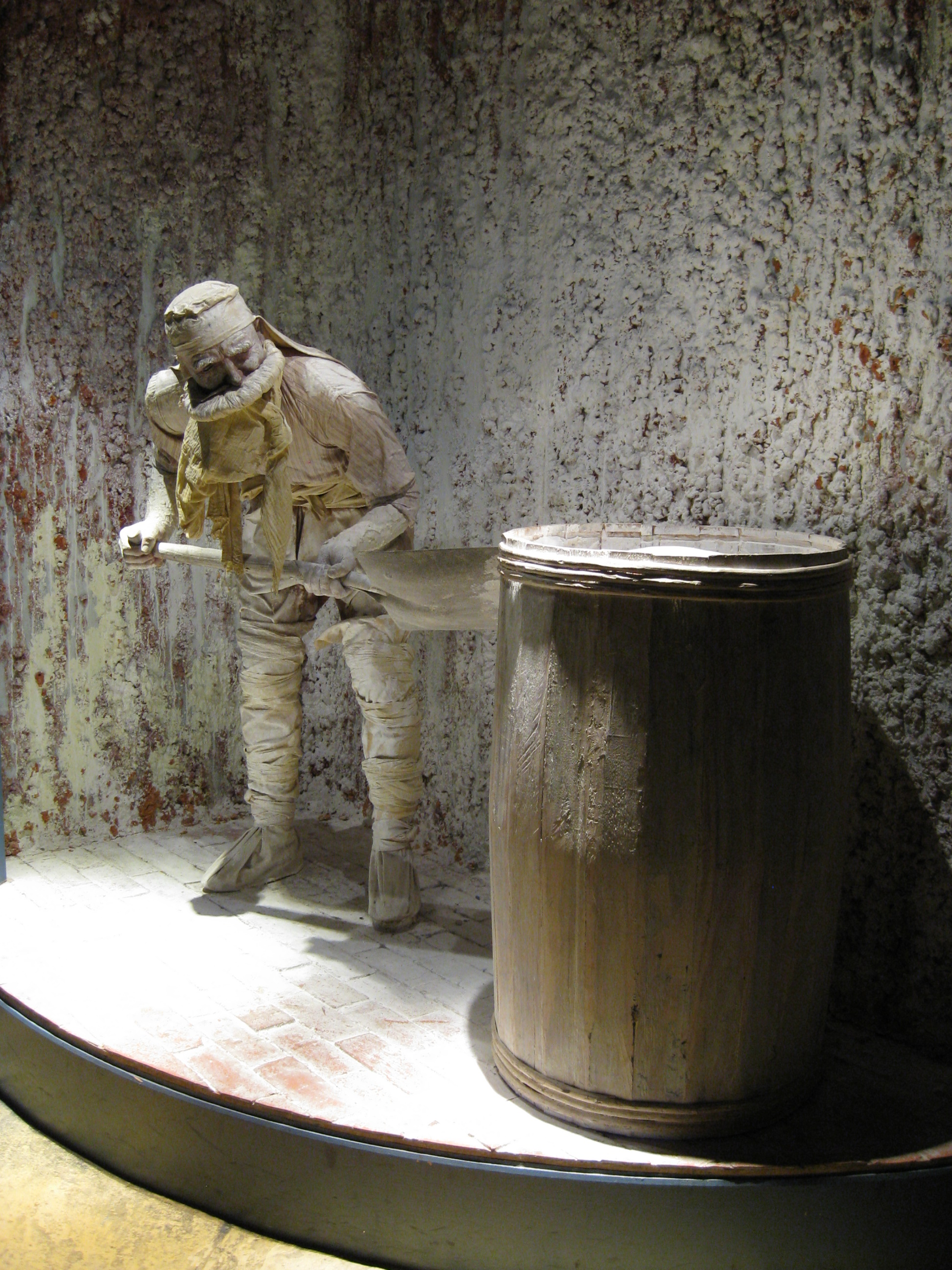
A bleach worker

The textile bleaching (or bleaching of textiles) is one of the steps in the textile manufacturing process. The objective of bleaching is to remove the natural color for the following steps such as dyeing or printing or to achieve full white. All raw textile materials, when they are in natural form, are known as 'greige' material. They have their natural color, odor and impurities that are not suited to clothing materials. Not only the natural impurities will remain in the greige material, but also the add-ons that were made during its cultivation, growth and manufacture in the form of pesticides, fungicides, worm killers, sizes, lubricants, etc. The removal of these natural coloring matters and add-ons during the previous state of manufacturing is called scouring and bleaching.

A continuous bleaching range is a set of machines to carry out bleaching action. It consists of several compartments in which fabric moves from one side to another with the help of guide rollers and is treated with chemicals, heated, rinsed, and squeezed. Continuous bleaching is possible for the fabrics in open-width or rope form.

== History ==
Bleaching can be dated back to at least 1000 BC from an Egyptian list found in the tomb of Rekh-mi-re at Thebes, which mentioned both bleached and unbleached linen. Mulrooney dates it back as far as 5000 BC, while Walton claims it was introduced to Egypt from Asia. It’s plausible that it was discovered independently by different cultures. It’s generally assumed to have developed after noticing that garments are naturally bleached by sunlight and washing. Wood ash (potash, or impure potassium hydroxide) was an early form of soap, known to have been used in bleaching since at least 1 AD. This process of washing cloth in a solution of ashes (lye) and left in the sun, known as Grassing, is one of the oldest methods of bleaching textile goods. To bleach linen and cotton-based fabrics, the Grassing method has been used. Linen has long been bleached in Europe with Grassing method. The linens were laid out on the grass for over seven days after boiling with the ''lyes of ashes and rinsing''. Bleachfield was an open area to spread cloth, it was a field near watercourse used by a bleachery. Bleachfields were common in and around the mill towns during the British Industrial Revolution

The Dutch were bleaching by about the 12th century and are credited with soaking the bleached cloth in a bath of soured milk for 5–8 days. This softened and neutralised the harsh effects of the caustic lye. By the 17th century the Dutch were renowned for their bleaching skills and much of their trade was for customers abroad. Around 1756 an alternative to soured milk was proposed by the Scottish doctor, Francis Home using a weak solution of sulphuric acid. This was made commercially viable by John Roebuck's manufacture of sulphuric acid and reduced the soaking time to 12–24 hours. A final rinse and drying finished the bleaching process.

The English East India Company imported bleached, painted and printed calico from India during the 17th century. This disrupted the English silk and wool trades and an act of parliament, the Encouragement of Manufactures Act 1698 (11 Will. 3. c. 10), was passed that prohibited the wearing of printed calicos manufactured in China, India or Persia. This inadvertently established a calico bleaching and printing industry using unbleached Indian calico. A second law in 1721 prohibited the use and wear of all printed, painted, stained or dyed calicoes which stimulated demand for linen and fustian. The calico acts were repealed in 1774 when cloth was made using imported cotton from America.

=== Discovery of Chlorine ===
After discovering Chlorine in the late 18th century, when chemical bleaching came into existence, the chemical bleaching rose above Grassing, as it was quicker and possible in indoors.

The French chemist Claude Louis Berthollet first demonstrated the bleaching properties of chlorine and subsequently developed liquid bleaches around 1789. James Watt is credited with bringing it to Britain, and a fellow Scot, Charles Tennant patented a more practical bleaching powder that made chlorine-based bleaching a commercial success.

== Scouring ==
Scouring is the first process carried out with or without chemicals, at room temperature or at suitable higher temperatures with the addition of suitable wetting agents, alkali and so on. Scouring removes the impurities such as waxes, pectins and makes the textile material hydrophilic or water absorbent. Scouring is then followed by the bleaching process.

== Bleaching ==
The term "bleach" originates from a French word signifying "to whiten". In essence, the process of bleaching involves whitening by removing substances that impart color to the material undergoing the bleaching treatment. Bleaching is the process of decolorizing the material after it has been scoured. Bleaching textiles can be classified as oxidative bleaching and reductive bleaching which can be carried out with oxidizing and reductive bleaching agents. Bleaching agents attack the chromophores and alter the color absorbing properties of the objects.

=== Oxidative bleaching ===
Generally oxidative bleachings are carried out using sodium hypochlorite, sodium chlorite or sulfuric acid.

Vegetable fibres, animal fibers, and mineral fibres are the three major types of natural fibers. Natural fibers such as cotton, ramie, jute, wool, and regenerated fibers such as bamboo are all generally bleached with oxidative methods.

==== Oxygen bleaching action ====
It is the conjugated double bonds of the substrate that makes the substrate capable of absorbing visible light. Hence, it looks yellower and need bleaching. When bleaching action carries out with oxygen, it removes the chromophoric sites and makes the cloths whiter. Oxygen is a degrading bleaching agent. The major source of chemical bleaching is Hydrogen peroxide H_{2}O_{2} that contains a single bond, (–O–O–). When this breaks down it gives rise to very reactive oxygen specie, which is the active agent of the bleach. Around sixty percent of the world Hydrogen peroxide is used in chemical bleaching of textiles and wood pulp.

=== Reductive bleaching ===
Reductive bleaching is done with sodium hydrosulphite, a powerful reducing agent. Fibres like polyamides, polyacrylics and polyacetates can be bleached using reductive bleaching technology.

=== Textile whitening ===
Bleaching of textiles may include an additional application of optical brighteners (OBAs). Optical brightening agents are chemical compounds that absorb light in the ultraviolet and violet region (usually 340–370 nm) of the electromagnetic spectrum, and re-emit light in the blue region (typically 420–470 nm) by fluorescence. After scouring and bleaching, optical brightening agents are applied to make the textile material appear a more brilliant white. These OBAs are available in different tints such as blue, violet and red.

== Whiteness ==
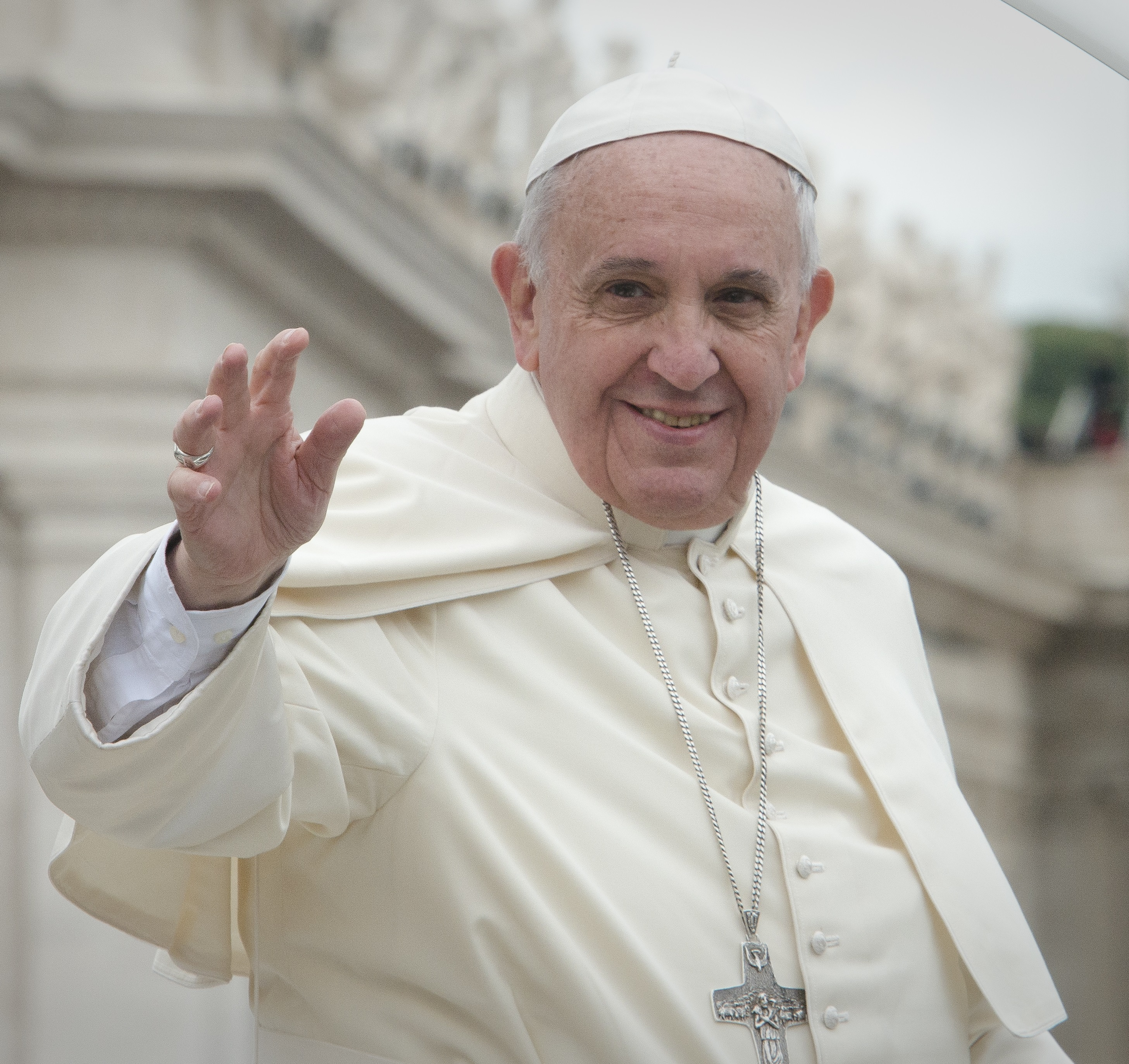
Pope Francis at the Vatican. Popes have traditionally worn white since 1566.

Whiteness in colorimetry is the degree to which a surface is white. The term "whiteness" refers to the degree to which a surface resembles the properties of a perfect reflecting diffuser, i.e. an ideal reflecting surface that neither absorbs nor transmits light, but instead reflects it evenly in all directions.

=== CIE Whiteness ===
CIE Whiteness is a formula that measures the degree of whiteness. The CIE Whiteness Index is a measure or methodology developed by the Commission on illumination.

== Gallery ==
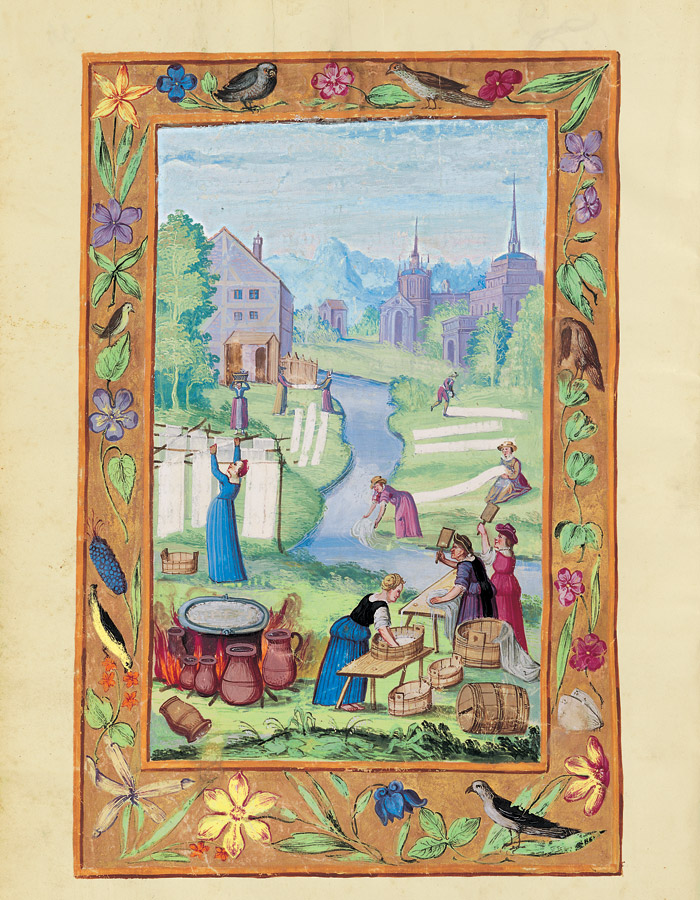
Grassing, laying out linens to bleach in sunlight

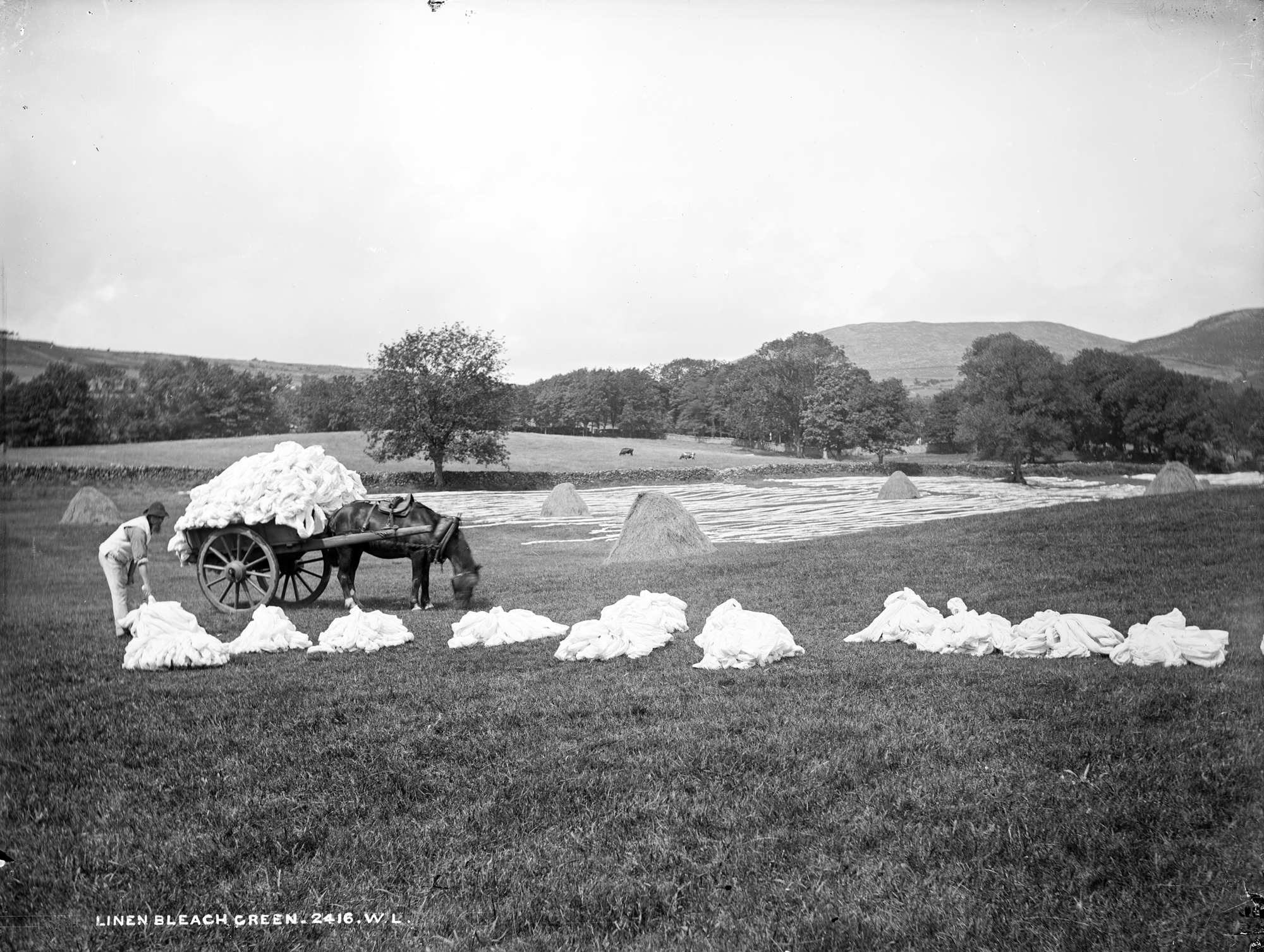
Linen bleaching/ grassing

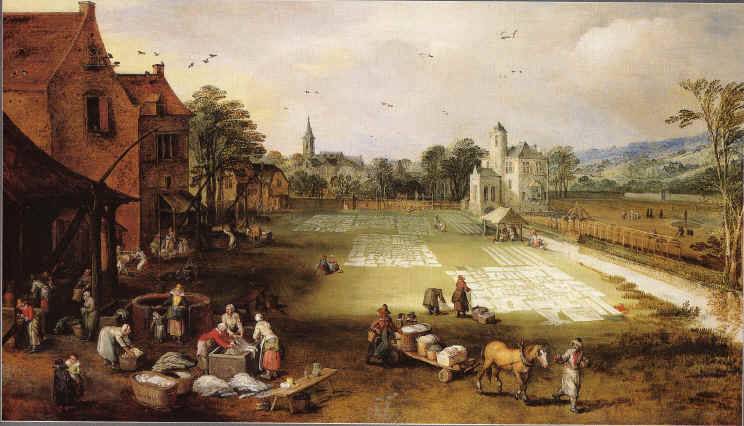
Bleekveld in een dorp (Bleachfield in a village), circa 1650 (Jan Brueghel the Younger)

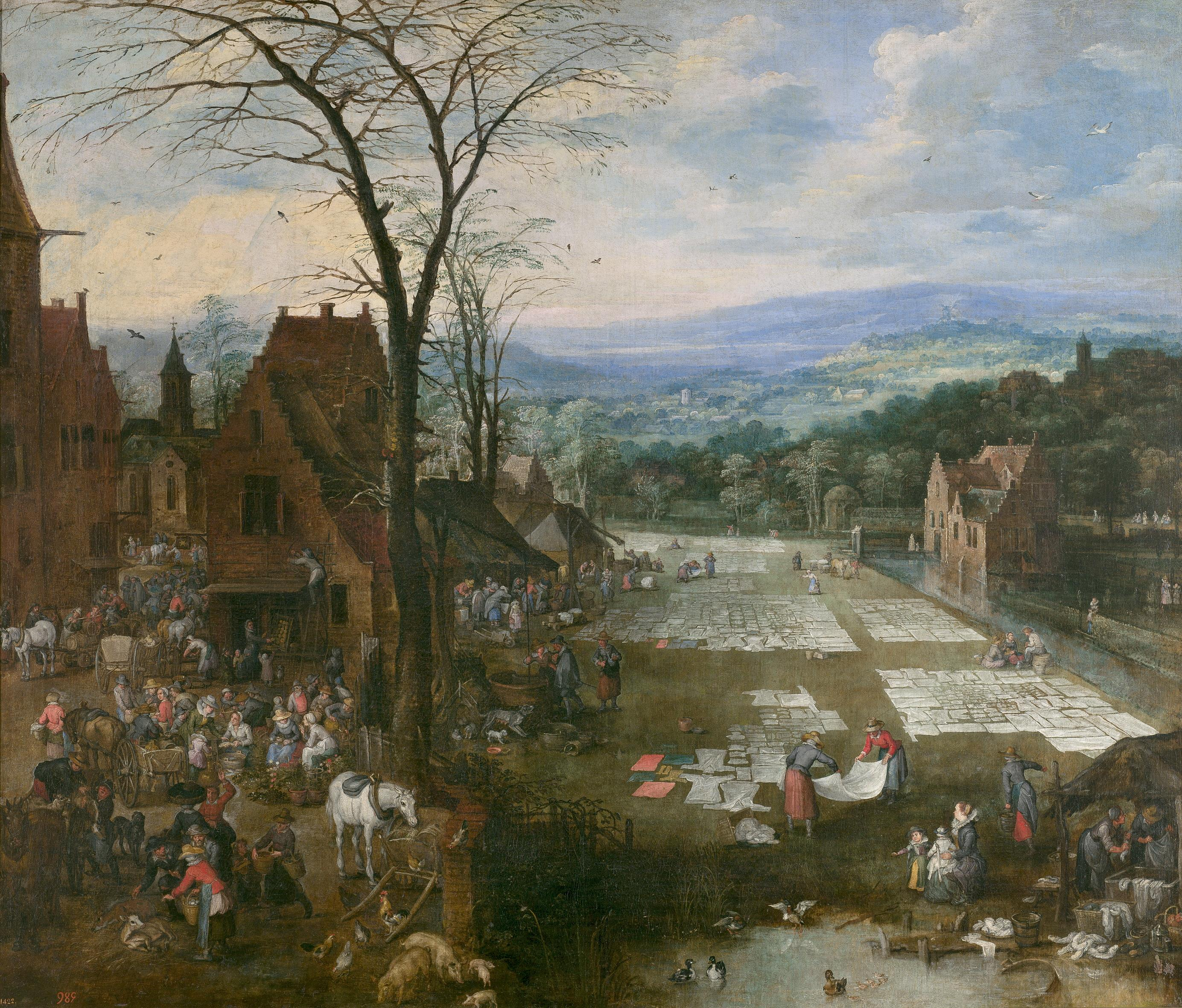
Market and washing place in Flanders

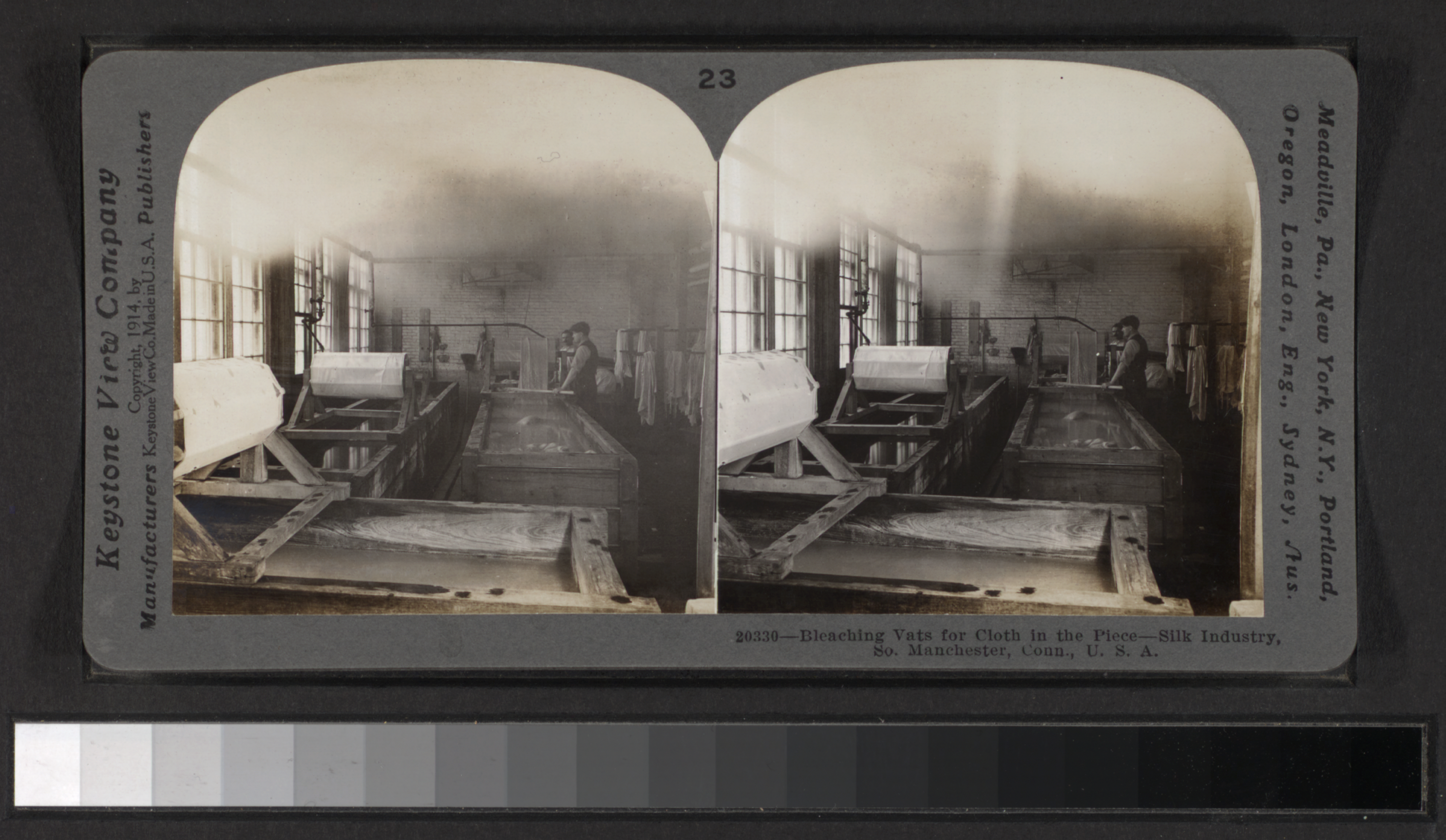
Bleaching vats for cloth in the piece

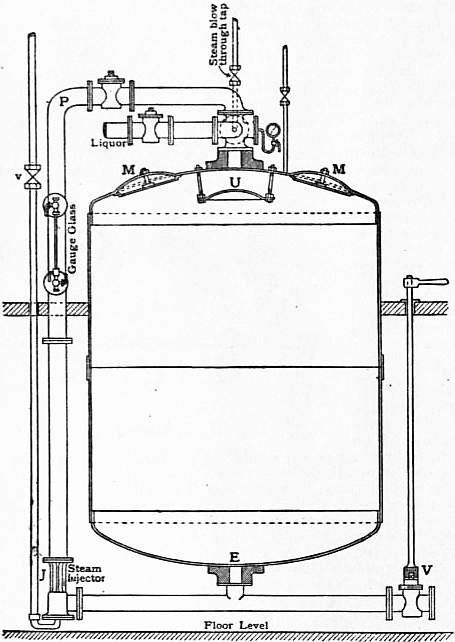
High Pressure Blow-through Kier

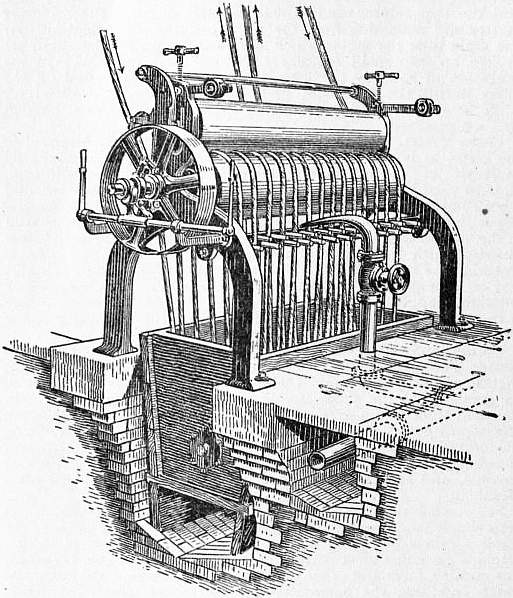
Bleaching—The Mather Kier, cross section

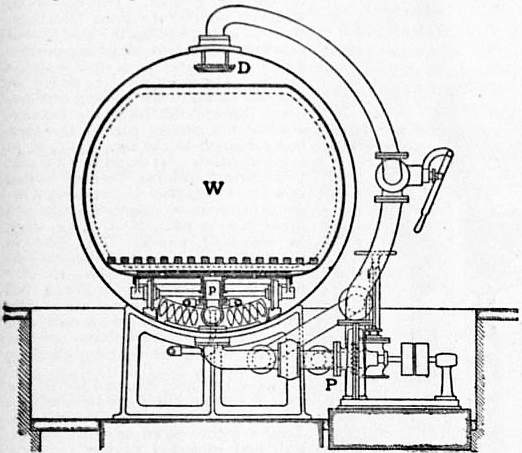
Bleaching—The Mather Kier, cross section

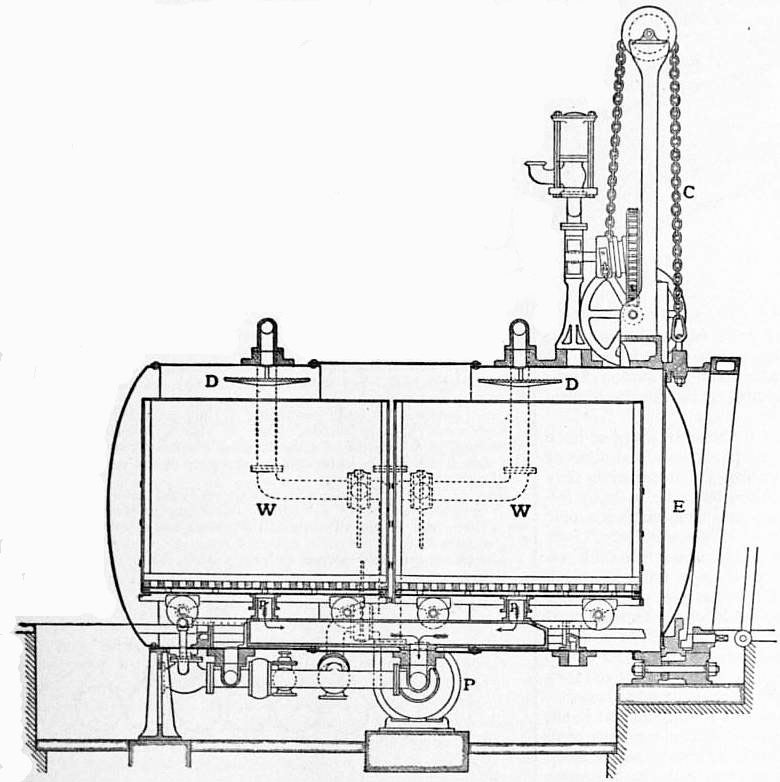
Bleaching—The Mather Kier, longitudinal section

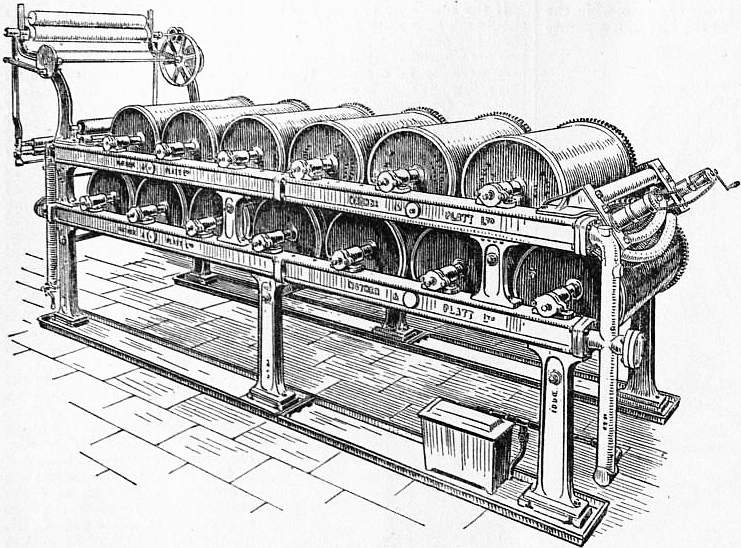
Bleaching—Mather & Platt’s Horizontal Drying Machine

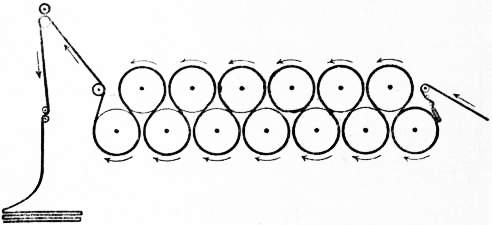
Bleaching—Horizontal Drying Machine threaded with Cloth

== See also ==
- White
- Dyeing
- Color of clothing
- Color temperature
- History of cotton
