= Fabric tube turning =

Sewing technique

Fabric tube turning is a sewing technique where an object is sewn with the right sides facing one another, leaving an opening, and is then "turned" out, concealing the stitching and unfinished edge, and leaving an opening through which filler or stuffing may be put into the object. Fabric may be turned with a common item such as a chopstick, or with tools such as the Fasturn, Loop Turners, or Hemostats.

Stiffer fabrics and narrower tubes are more difficult to turn than softer fabrics and broader tubes.
