= Crab lining =

Technique used to catch crabs

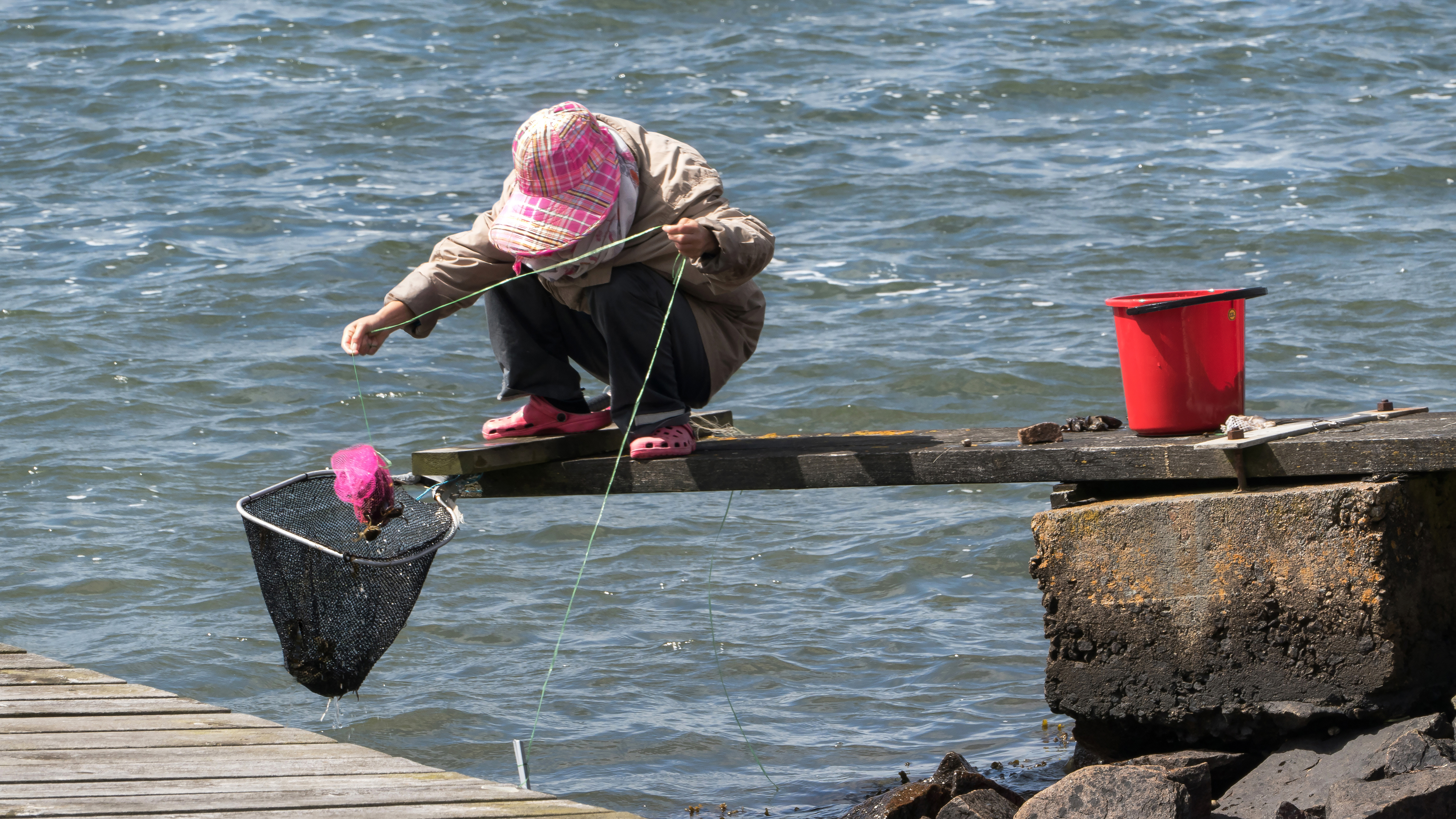
A woman crab lining in Brofjorden, Sweden

Crab lining (or crabbing) is a handlining technique used to catch crabs.

A piece of bait, normally the neck or leg of a chicken, is tied to one end with a weight in order to keep it from floating. The line is then cast by hand to an area approximately five to ten feet from where it is being cast. This is to ensure easy retrieval of the line and to avoid unnecessary time spent fighting currents, rocks, and other obstacles in the water. Once a crab takes the bait, the line will tighten. It is important to not tug at the line once a pull is noticed. The line must be slowly retrieved, inch-by-inch, until the crab is visible in the water. Upon visibility, a hand net may be used to capture the crab.

This technique is widely used by travelers, children, and recreational fishermen to catch crabs in bays, jetties, and piers throughout the world. The most commonly caught species of crabs through this technique is blue crabs.

== Equipment ==
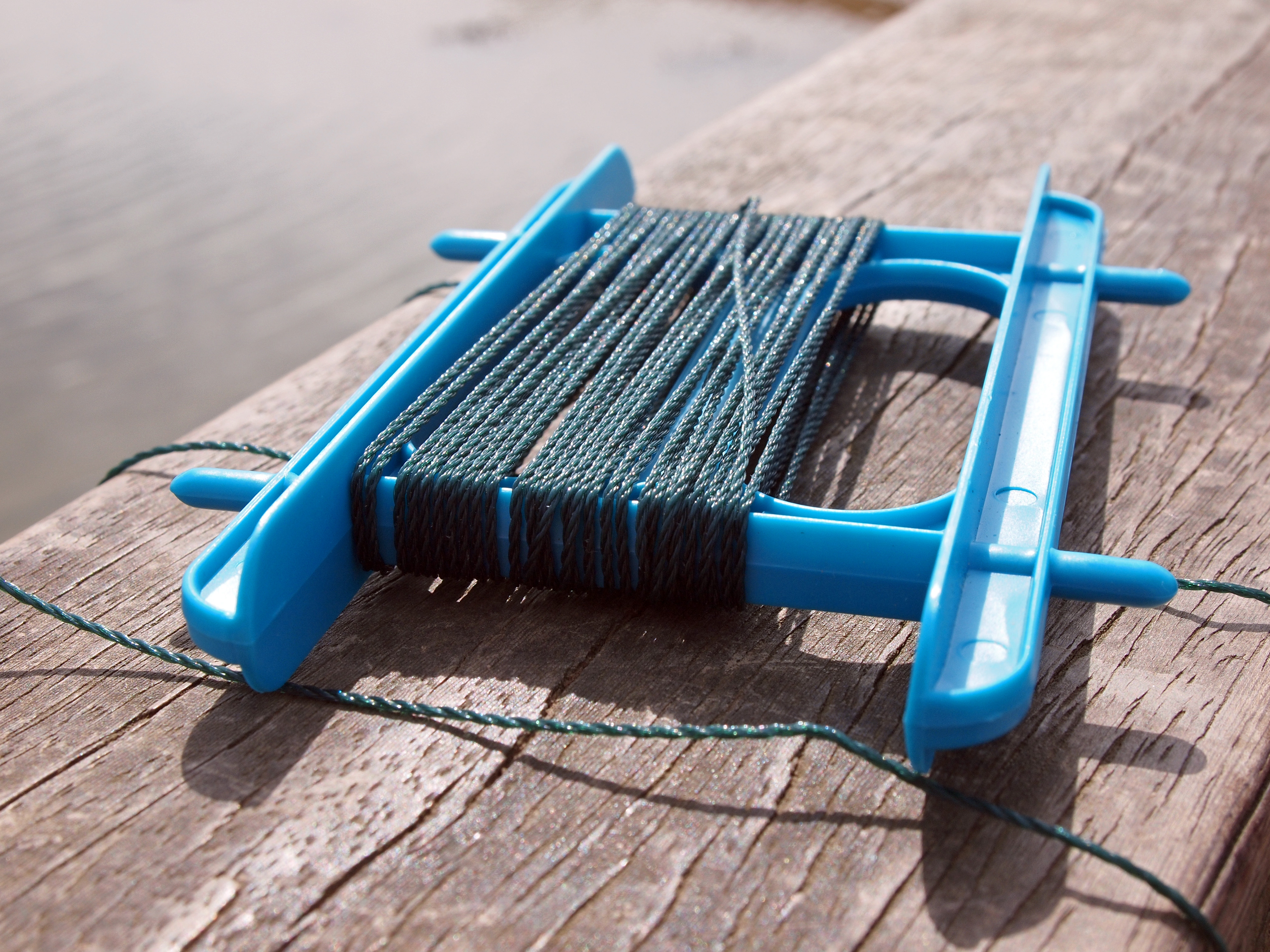
A crabbing line

Crabbing may be done with a 15-pound (6.8 kg) or heavier monofilament fishing line, a braided fishing line or a length of twine. A 7 ft. or longer hand net may be used to catch the crab as it is lifted from the water.

Common baits are chicken (drumstick or chicken neck), fish (mullet (fish), mackerel, squid) or bacon.

== Regulations ==
Although there are restrictions for commercial fishermen, crabbing with hand lines for recreational purposes is open throughout the year in most states in the US. There are limits and seasons for catching female crabs, covered by individual state fishery guidelines.
