= Calendering (textiles) =

Finishing process

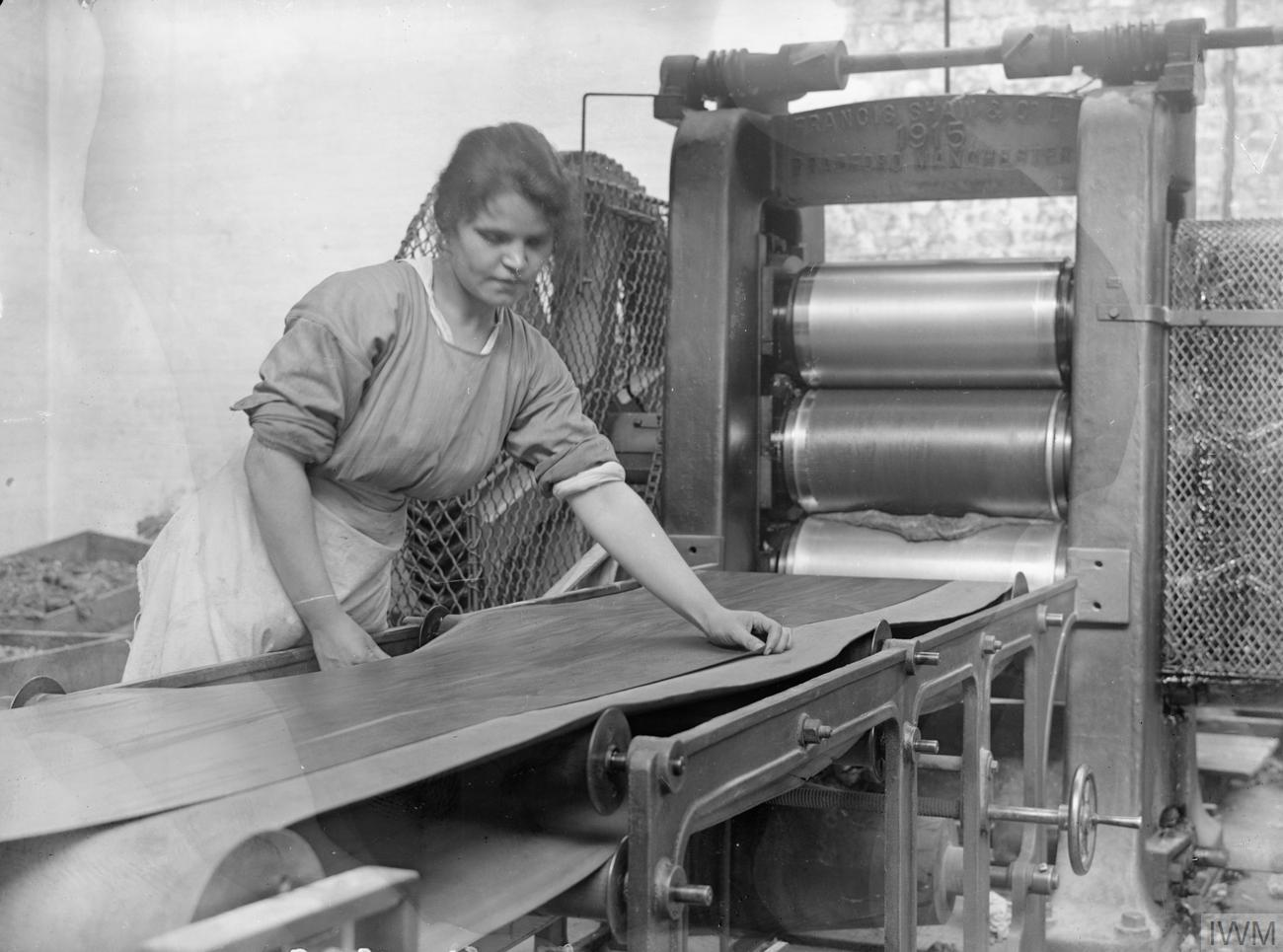
A worker operates a calendering machine in a rubber factory in Manchester, September 1918

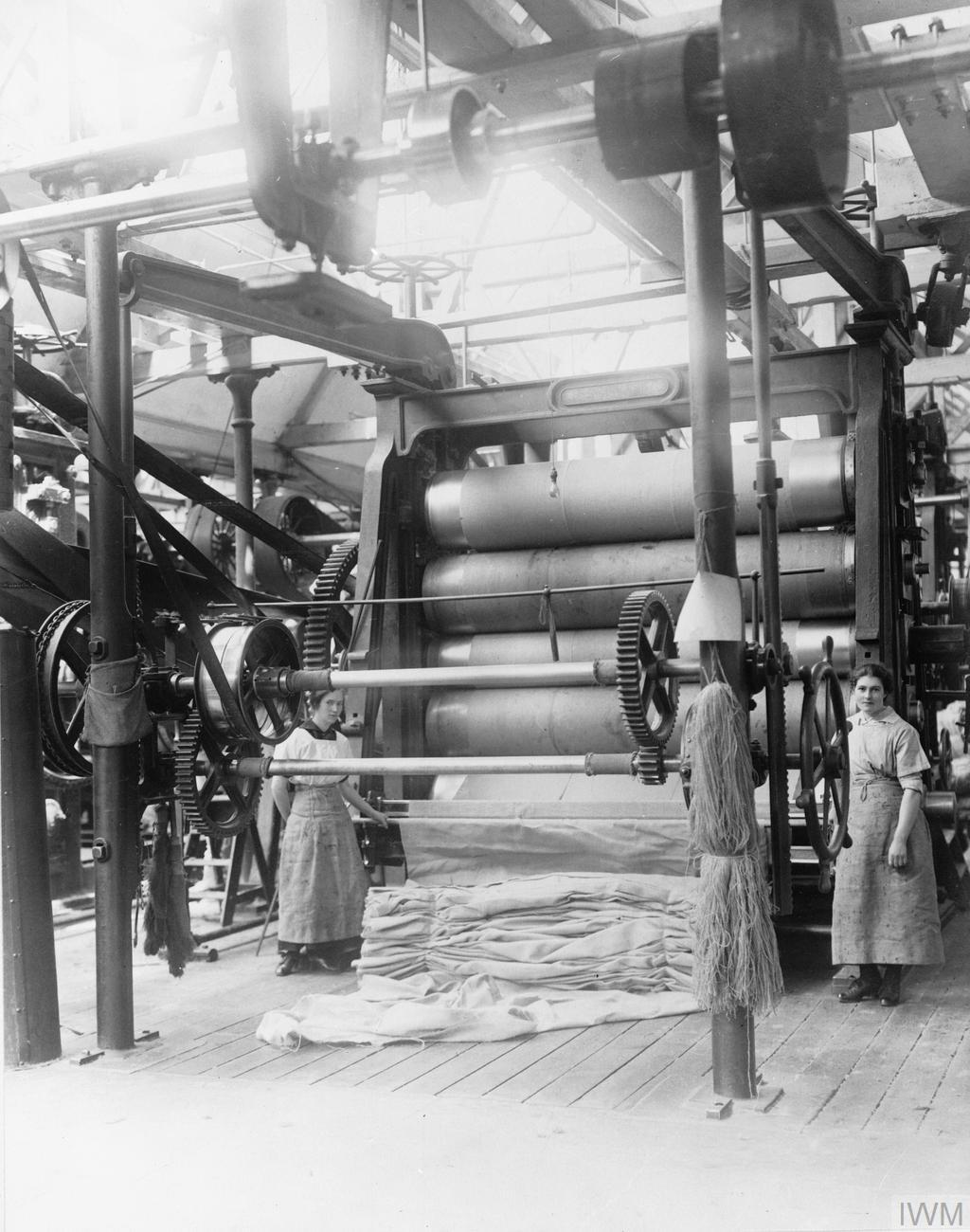
Calendering of fabric to be used for sandbags, August 1918

Calendering of textiles is a finishing process used to smooth, coat, or thin a material. With textiles, fabric is passed between calender rollers at high temperatures and pressures. Calendering is used on fabrics such as moire to produce their watered effect and also on cambric and some types of sateens.

In preparation for calendering, the fabric is folded lengthwise with the front side, or face, inside, and stitched together along the edges. The fabric can be folded together at full width, however this is done less often as it is more difficult. The fabric is then run through rollers at high temperatures and pressure that polish the surface and make the fabric smoother and more lustrous. Fabrics that go through the calendering process feel thin, glossy and papery.

The wash durability of a calendered finish on thermoplastic fibers like polyester is higher than on cellulose fibers such as cotton, though each depends on the amount and type of finishing additives used and the machinery and process conditions employed. Durability of blended fabrics reflects the above, and the proportion of synthetic fiber component.

== Variations ==
Various finishes can be achieved through the calendering process by varying different aspects of the process. The main types are beetling, watered, embossing, and Schreiner.

=== Beetled ===
Beetling is a finish given to cotton and linen cloth, and makes it look like satin. In the beetling process the fabric goes over wooden rollers and is beaten with wooden hammers.

=== Watered ===
The watered finish, also known as moire, is produced by using ribbed rollers. These rollers compress the cloth and the ribs produce the characteristic watermark effect by differentially moving and compressing threads. In the process some threads are left round while others are flattened somewhat.

=== Embossed ===
The embossing process uses rollers with engraved patterns, which are stamped onto the fabric, which gives the fabric a raised and sunken look. This works best with soft fabrics.

=== Schreiner ===
Similar to the watered process, the Schreiner process uses ribbed rollers, though very fine, with as many as six hundred ribs per inch. Pressed flat under extremely high pressure, the threads receive tiny lines, which cause the fabric to reflect light better than a flat surface. The high luster of cloth finished with the Schreiner method can be made more lasting by heating the rollers.

== History ==
Historically calendering was done by hand with a huge pressing stone. For example, in China huge rocks were brought from the north of the Yangtze River. The pressing stone was cut into a bowl shape, and the surface of the curved bottom made perfectly smooth. After a piece of cloth was placed underneath the stone the worker would stand on the stone and rock it with his feet to press the cloth.

== See also ==
- London shrunk
- Mercerize
