= Haberdasher =

In the UK, a seller of small sewing articles; in the US, a retailer of men's clothing

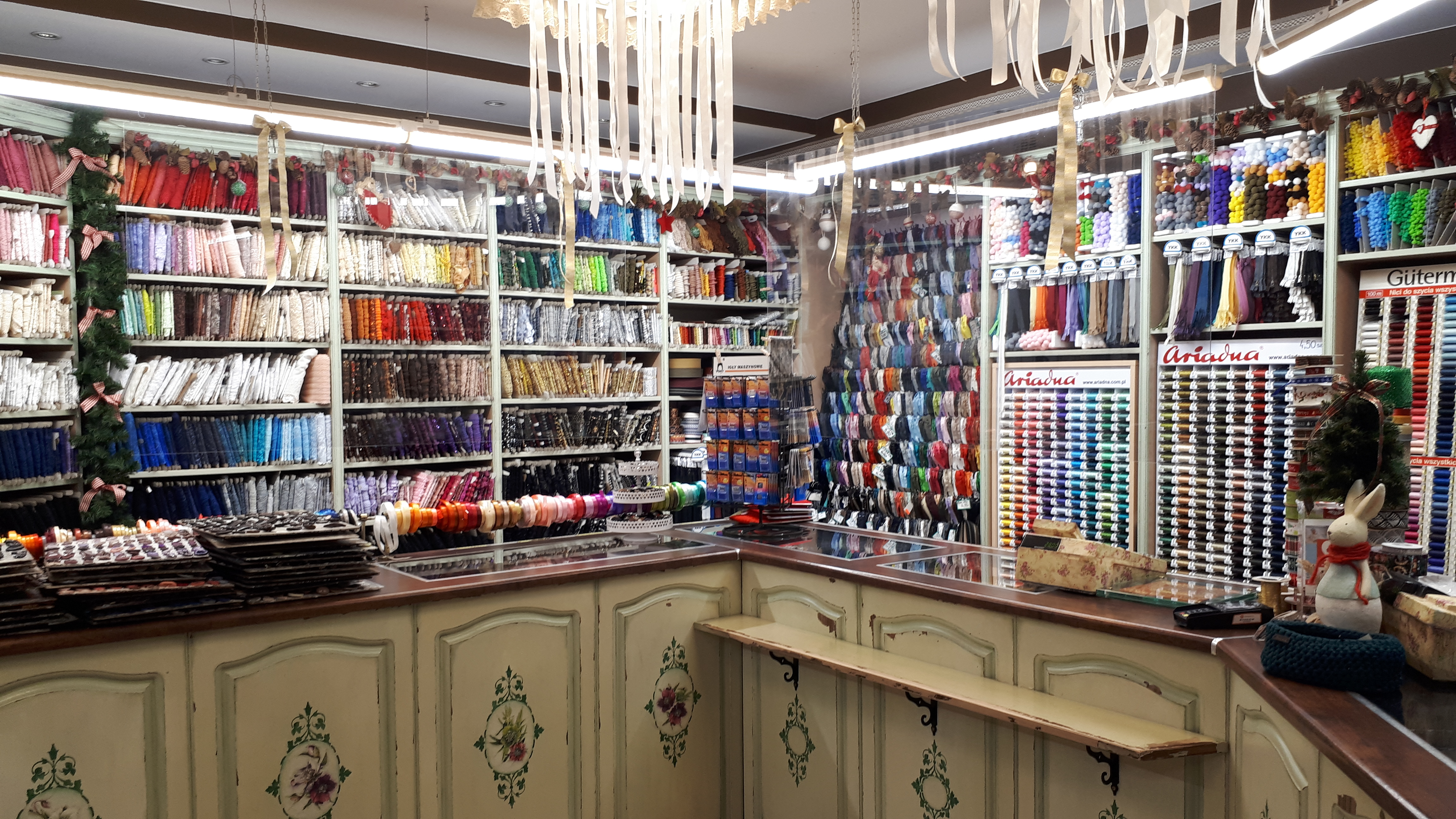
- Haberdashers (notions shop) in Białystok, Poland

Occupation
- Activity sectors: Retail

Description
- Competencies: Sewing, tailoring

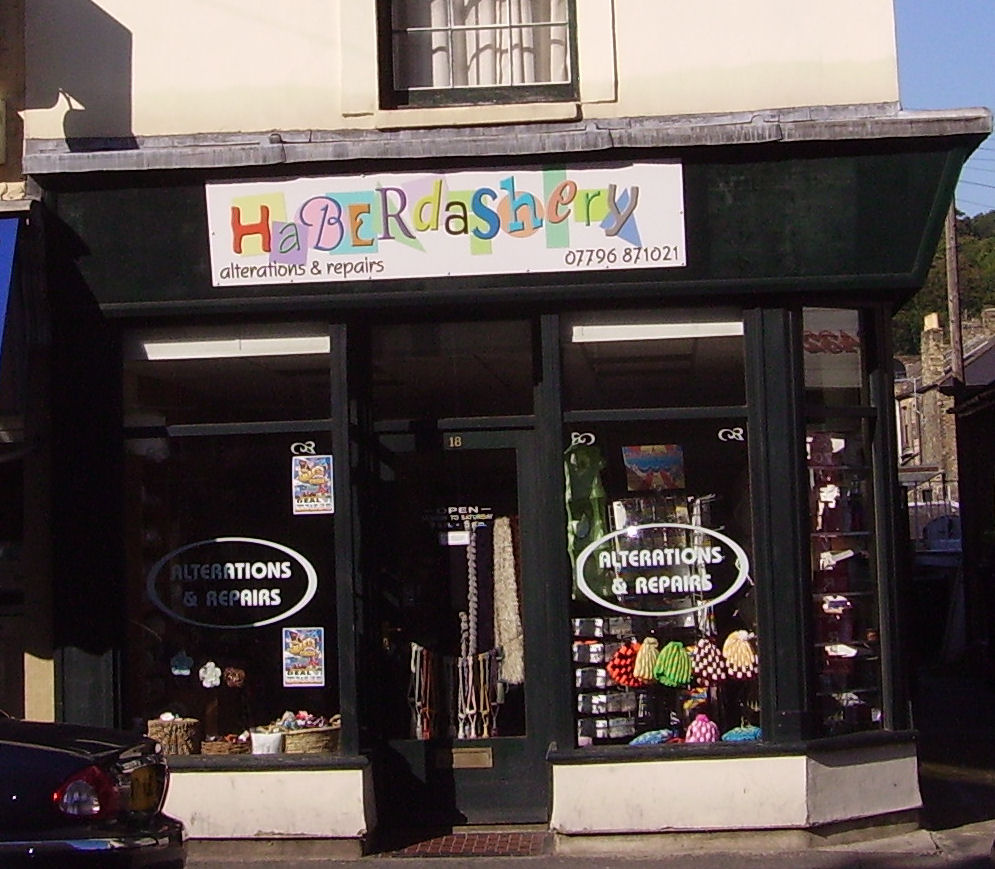
Haberdashers (notions shop) in Dover, UK

In British English, a haberdasher is a business or person who sells fabric and small articles for sewing, dressmaking and knitting, such as buttons, ribbons and zips; in the United States, the term refers instead to a men's clothing store that sells suits, shirts, neckties, men's dress shoes and other items.

== Etymology and usage ==
The word haberdasher appears in Chaucer's Canterbury Tales. It is derived from the Anglo-French word hapertas. It is debatable what hapertas meant, but most likely it was some type of fabric or assorted small ware. A haberdasher would retail small wares, the goods of the pedlar, while a mercer would specialize in "linens, silks, fustian, worsted piece-goods and bedding".

In Belgium and elsewhere in Continental Europe, Saint Nicholas remains their patron saint, while Saint Catherine was adopted by the Worshipful Company of Haberdashers in the City of London.

== Sewing supplies and accessories ==
The sewing articles are called haberdashery in British English. The corresponding term is notions in American English, where haberdashery is the name for the shop itself, though it is largely an archaism now. In Britain, haberdashery shops, or haberdashers, were a mainstay of high street retail until recent decades, but are now uncommon, due to the decline in home dressmaking, knitting and other textile skills and hobbies, and the rise of internet shopping. They were very often drapers as well, the term for sellers of cloth.

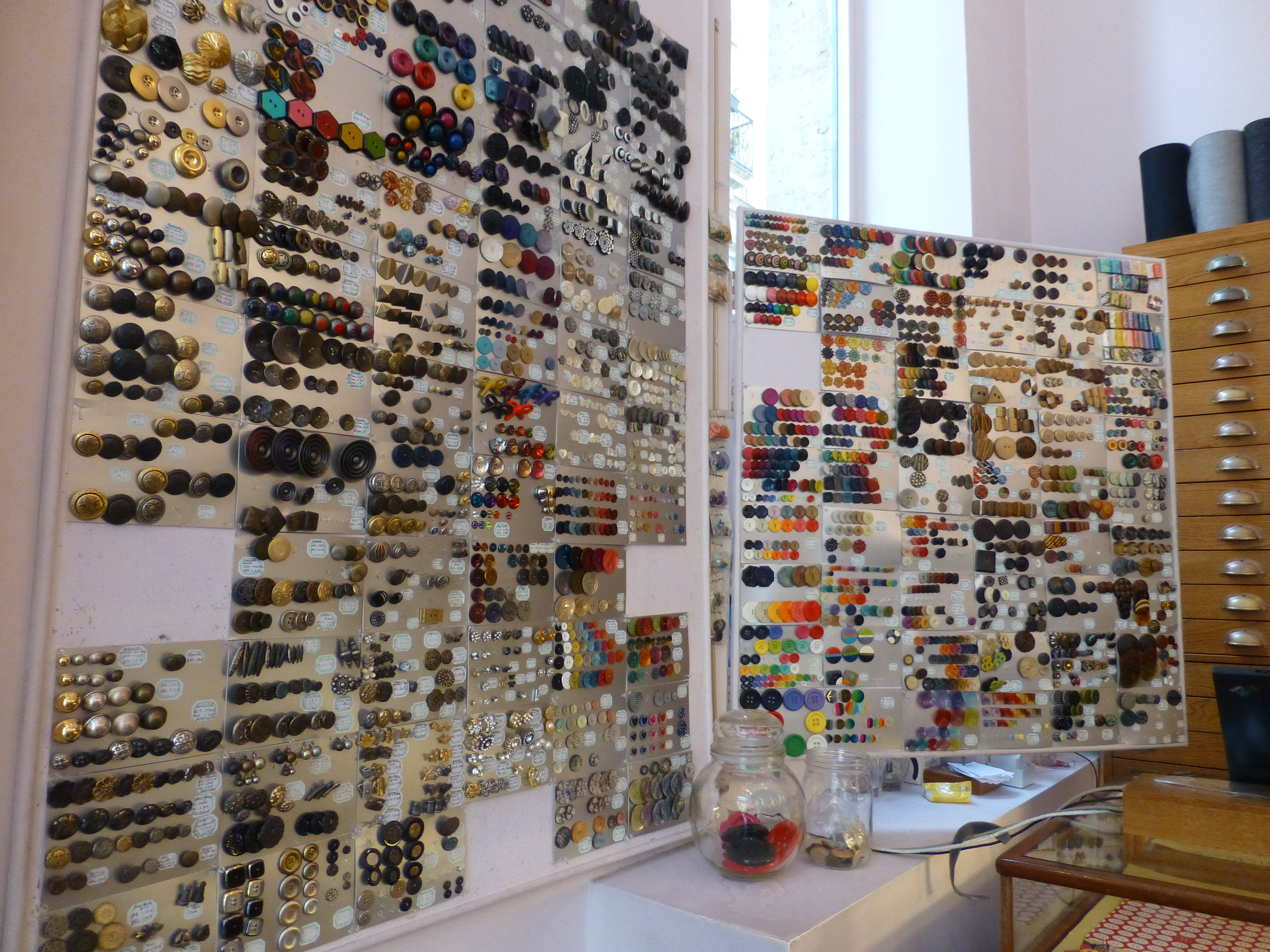

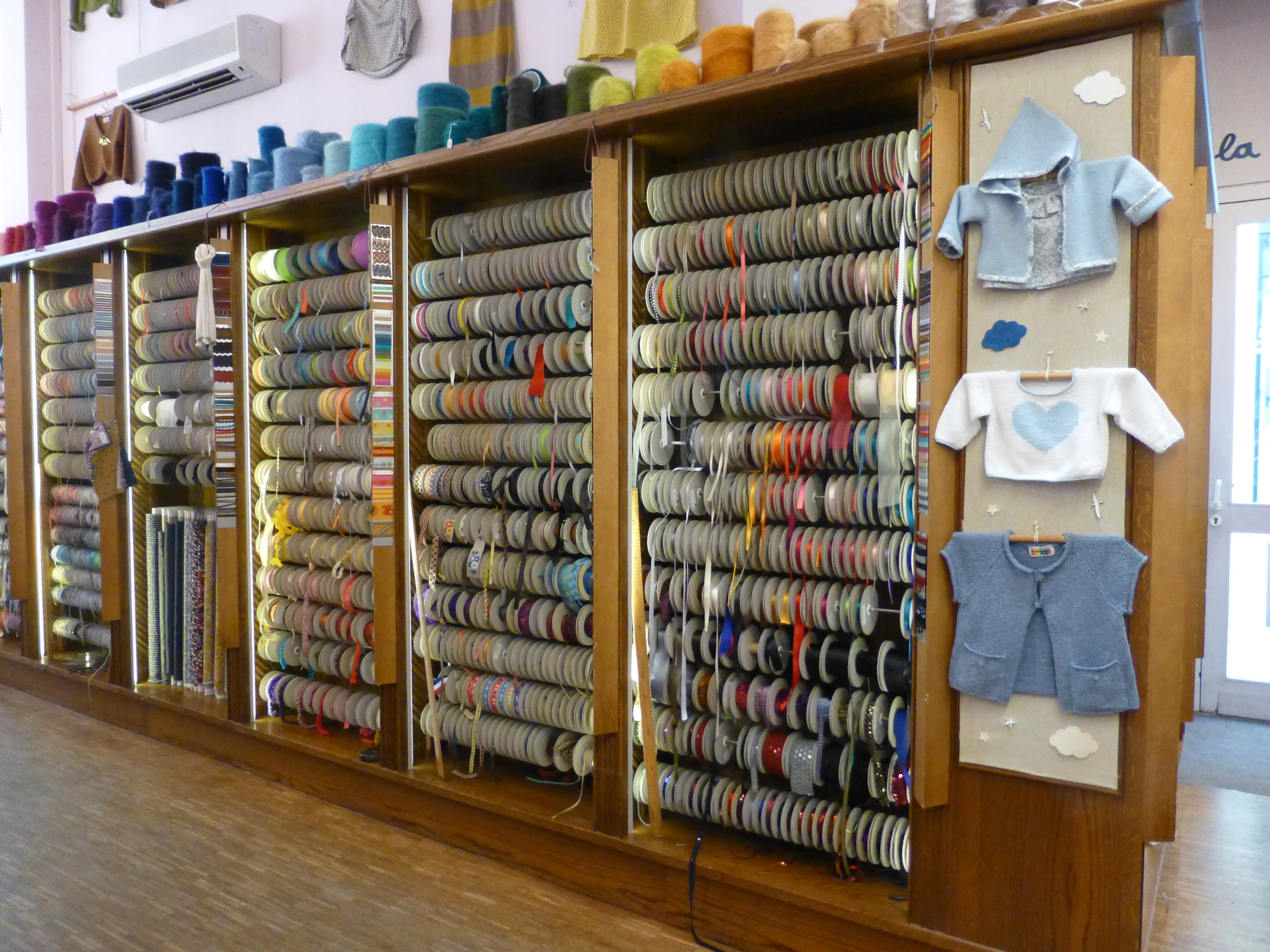

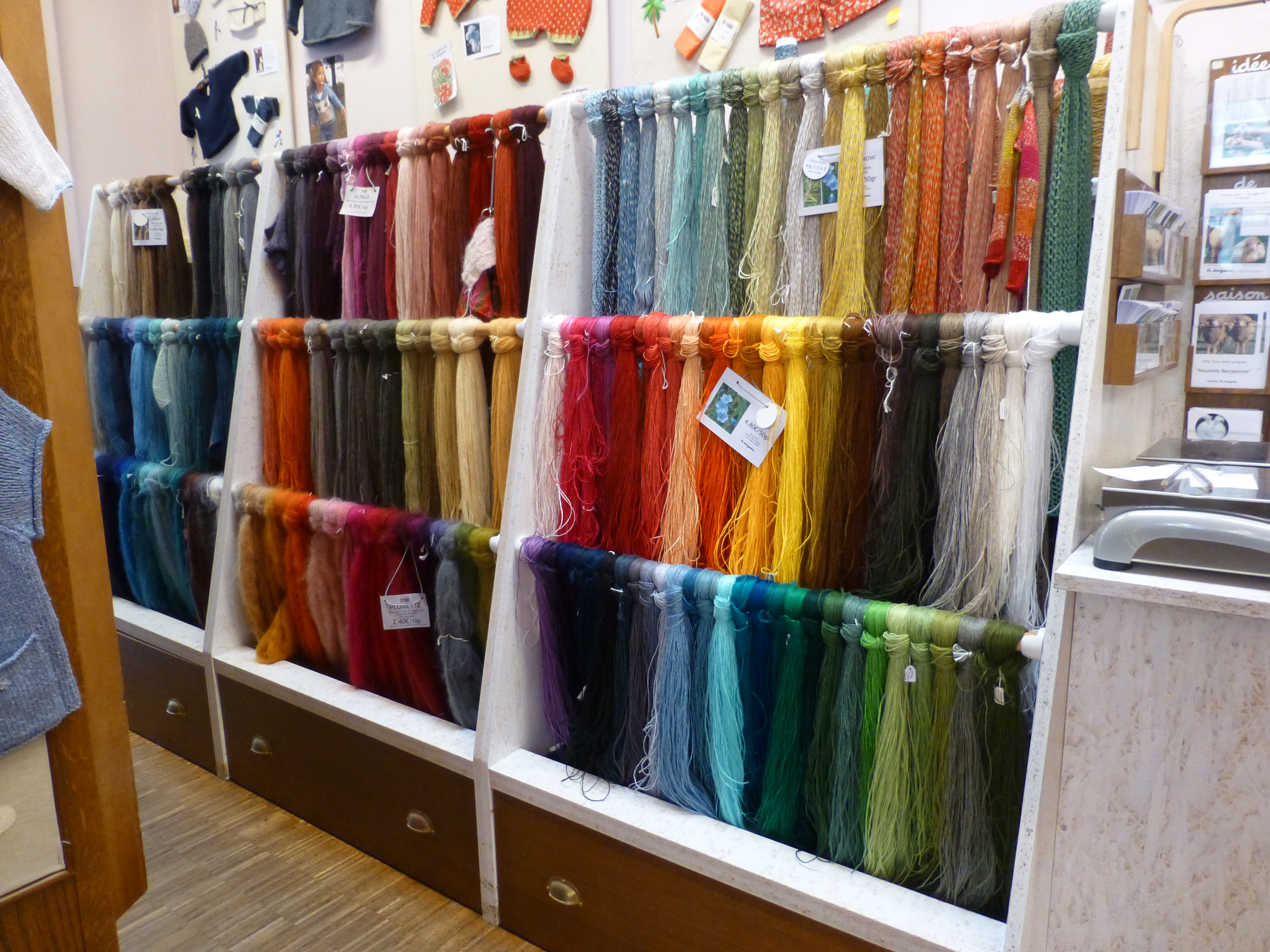

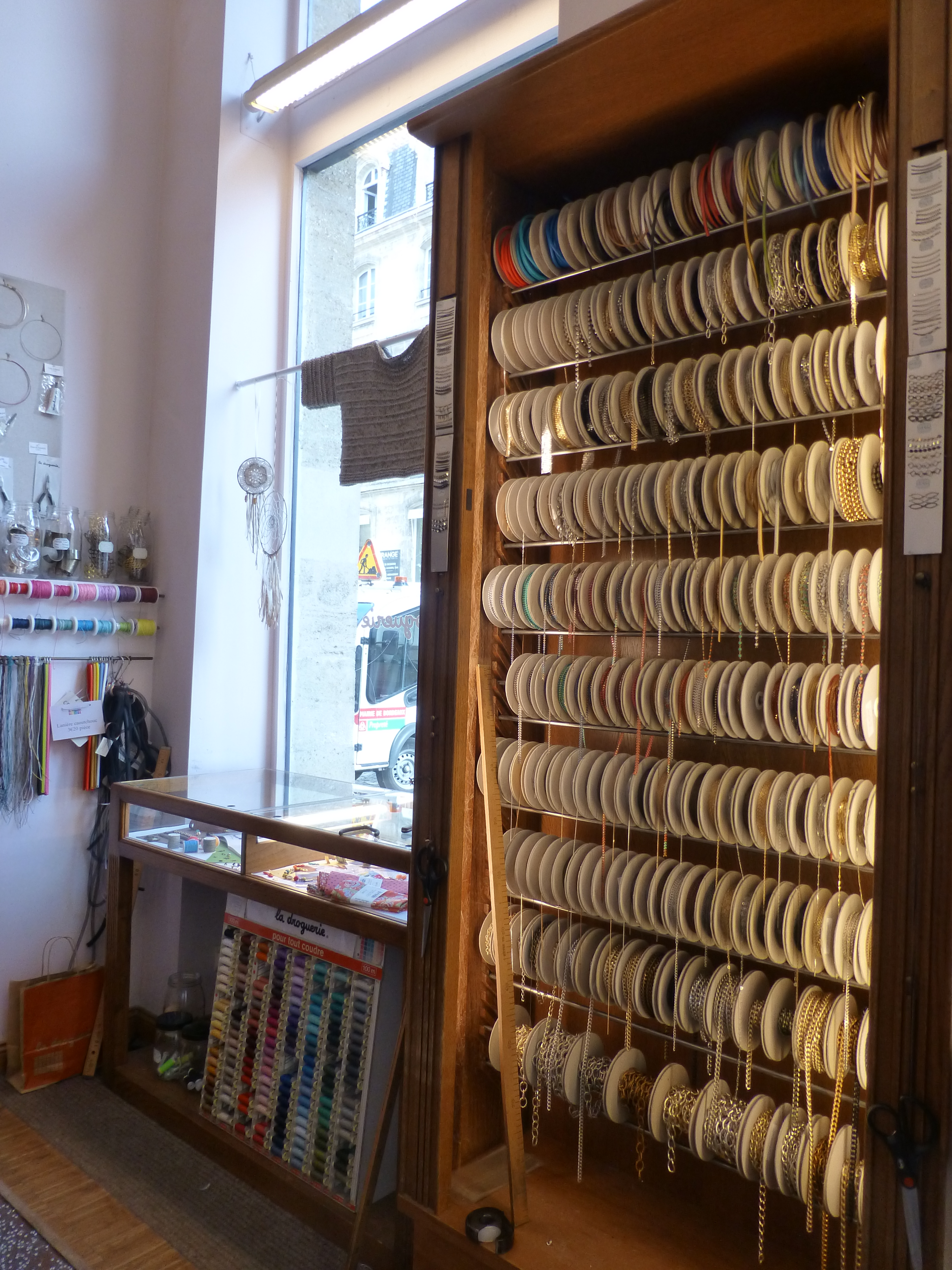
Haberdashers (notions shop) in Bordeaux, France

== System for selling goods ==
Woollen Cloth Act 1532
- Act of Parliament
- Parliament of England
- Long title: An Act concerning the true dying of Woollen Cloth.
- Citation: 24 Hen. 8. c. 2

Dates
- Royal assent: 7 April 1533
- Commencement: 4 February 1533
Other legislation
Repealed by	Statute Law Revision Act 1863

Status: Repealed

In Britain, haberdashery was originally a system for selling goods, and only later came to be used as the name for the types of goods sold under that system. Some goods, beer, sugar, and flour, for example, are sold in multiples of a specific quantity. Draught beer may only be offered for sale in pubs in third, half, two-thirds of a pint and multiples of half a pint; for example, a half-pint or pint. Mostly commonly draught beer is sold in pint measures (i.e. 20 fluid ounces). Draught beer may not be sold in public houses in other units e.g. millilitres, but this regulation does not apply to bottled beers. Similarly there are specified units for some other alcohols such as wines and spirits. Flour and sugar are sold by the kilogram, or the hundredweight, or the tonne, but the customer specifies the weight of the item they want to purchase as multiples of a standard quantity.

Some other goods, meat, petrol, and land, for example, are sold where the customer specifies what they want to purchase and the merchant has to calculate what quantity that is, and then calculate the price. In a butcher's, for example, the customer can specify where they want the butcher to cut the joint, who then puts the cut on the scale to see how much it weighs, and therefore how much it will cost. At a petrol station the customer puts as much petrol as they want into their vehicle and the merchant has to calculate what quantity that is and then calculate the price. The customer specifies the particular piece of land they want to purchase, and the seller has to calculate the area of that piece of land in order to determine the sale price.

The system of sale where the seller has to calculate the quantity has been known as haberdashery since at least as early as 1533 when an act of the English Parliament specified that meat must be sold by this system. The act, the Sale of Flesh Act 1532 (24 Hen. 8. c. 3), specified that:

it may be enacted by your Grace and the Lordes Spirituall and Temporall and the Commons in this presente Parliamente assembled and by authoritie of the same, that every persone, whiche shall sell by hym self, or any other, the Carcases of Beoffes Porke Mutton or Veale or any parte or parcell therof after the first day of Auguste nowe nexte ensuyng shall sell the same by laufull weighte called Haberdepayes and no otherwise; the said Flesshe to be cut out in reasonable peces, according to the requeste of the byer in like fascion as before this tyme hathe ben used, without fraude or covyn. And that every persone, which by hymself or any other shall sell any Flesshe of the said Carcases, shall have withe hym where he shall make sale of the said flesshe sufficient Beame Scales and Weyghtes sealed called Haberdepayes for true servyng of the byers. — Statutes of the Realm Vol. 3 (1509-47), p. 472.

In time the term came to be applied to goods sold under this system and it still applies in many greengrocers where the customer may purchase one apple, or a handful of mushrooms, if that's all they want, and it is this system of sale that was originally called haberdashery. In time the term came to be applied to certain types of goods sold by this system, and then to shops that sold those goods, so that in a modern haberdashery the customer may purchase one button if that's all they want.

== See also ==
- Hatter
- Mercery
