= Elastic (notion) =

Stretchy textile material

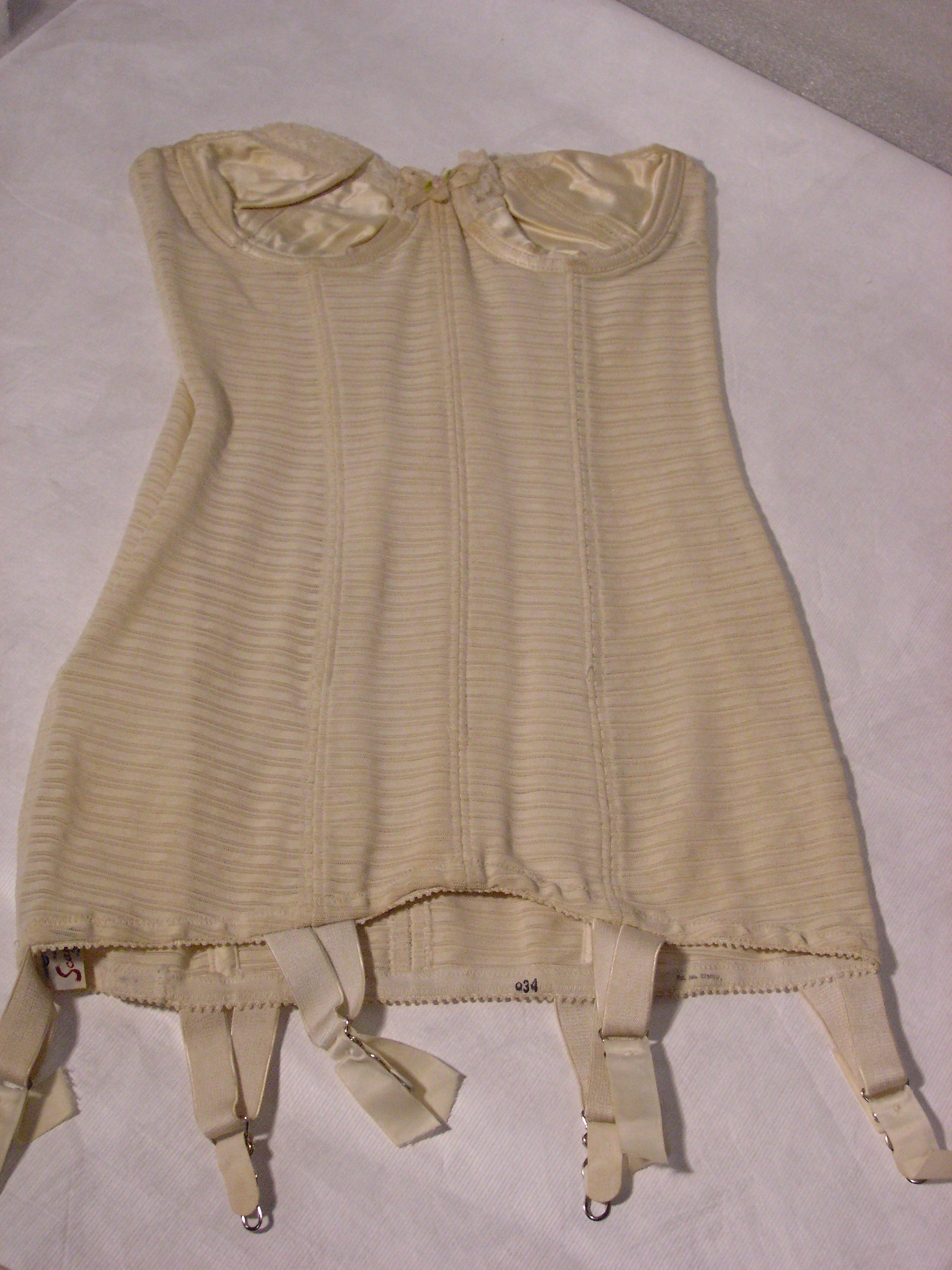
Corset made of elastic

In sewing, elastic is a notion which is sold in narrow strips and generally serves to increase the ability of garment to stretch, either to accommodate movement or to make the garment suitable for wearers of many different physical sizes. Elastic comes in four forms of construction, each with costs and benefits. The component which performs the actual stretching is made of either rubber or a synthetic material such as spandex; this stretching component is then covered with polyester, cotton, nylon, or a combination of these or other fibers which allow it to be attached to clothing. High-quality elastic is able to be stretched to twice its original length and then return to its unflexed state without showing appreciable wear.

== Types ==
Elastics may be either braided, knitted, woven, or transparent.

=== Braided ===
Braided elastic, the most common form of elastic, becomes more narrow as it stretches. Stitching or piercing this kind of elastic causes it to quickly lose its ability to return to its original shape (a ball-point sewing needle will minimize this damage). It has distinct parallel ribs along its surface, and is used for hems, swimwear, and leg bands.

=== Knitted elastic ===
Knitted elastic is considered soft, lightweight, and quite strong. It does not narrow when stretched, and piercing it with a needle does not affect its ability to return to its original shape. It is considered practical for lightweight fabrics. Knitted elastic may be used to create "fold-over elastic", also called "FOE", which has a strip down its center made of weaker material. This strip allows the elastic to be folded in half along its length, making it useful for finishing the edges of garments.

=== Woven elastic ===
Woven elastic, also called non-roll elastic, is very strong, and is firmer, thicker, and more shrink-resistant than other forms of elastic. It is used for items such as upholstery and car covers. It has both crosswise and lengthwise ribs, making it resemble a window pane. It does not narrow when stretched nor is it affected by being pierced, and its structure keeps it from rolling or folding when under stress.

=== Transparent elastic ===
Transparent elastic is actually transparent polyurethane and it is not braided, knitted, or woven. It can stretch to three or four times its original length with complete recovery to its former shape.

== Content ==
Rubber is made of latex, and today some elastics are made without rubber, particularly those used in the medical fields. The most common elastics, however, are made from latex-based rubber and polyester fibers— these forms tend to hold up well to being worn and washed regularly. Elastics made with nylon tend to have a soft luster to them, and are used for lingerie and some swimwear. They do not tolerate high heat, and should not be exposed to high temperatures inside a dryer. Other elastics are made with cotton, which tends to shrink slightly after being worn and washed but is very versatile and is an all-natural alternative to man-made fibers.
