= Seam ripper =

Sewing tool used for cutting stitches

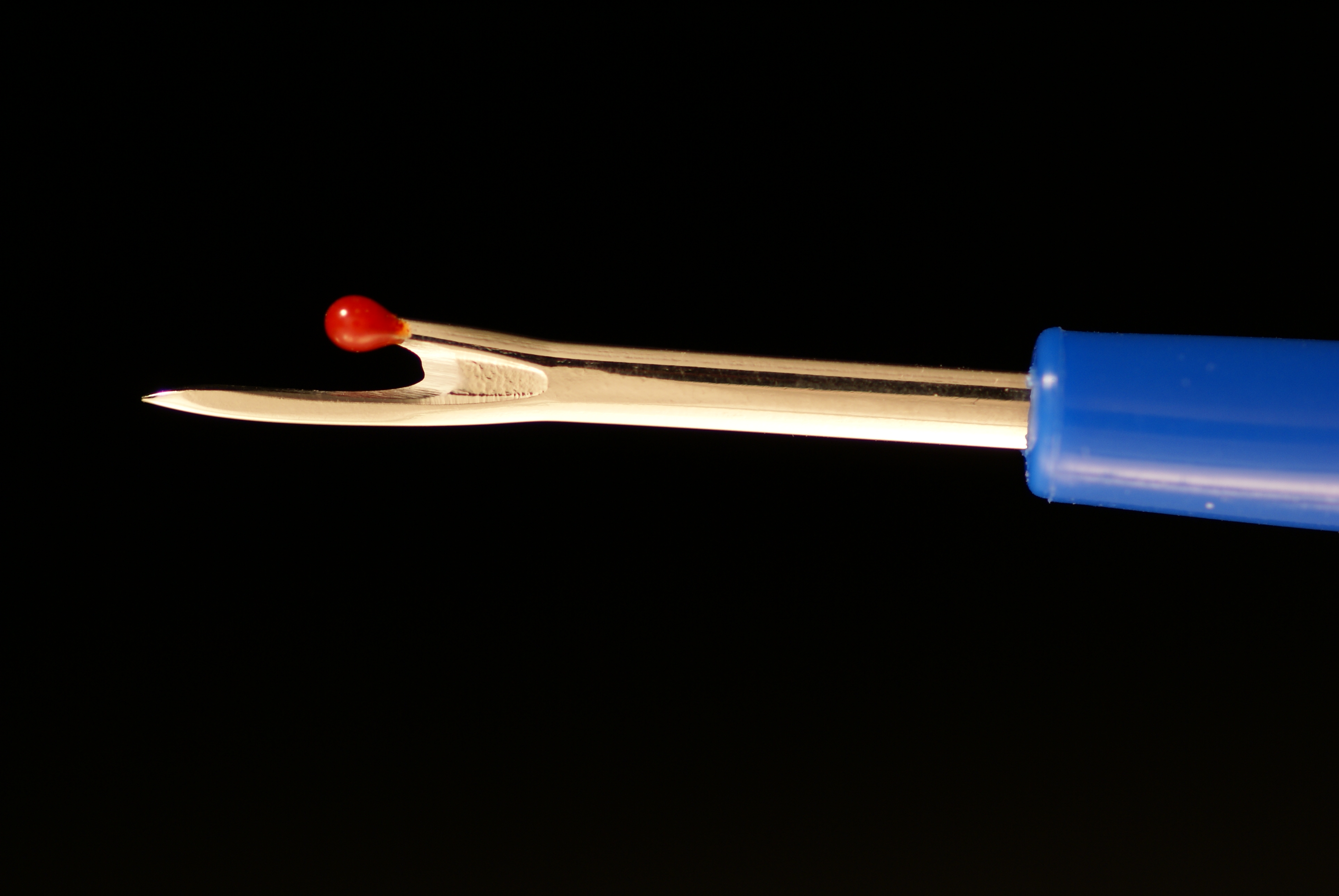
The forked head of a seam ripper

A seam ripper is a small sewing tool used for cutting and removing stitches.

The most common form consists of a handle, shaft and head, although knife-like designs also exist. The head is usually forked with a cutting surface situated at the base of the fork. In some designs, one side of the fork tapers to a sharp point to allow easier insertion in tight stitching.

In using a seam ripper, the sharp point of the tool is inserted into the seam underneath the thread to be cut. The thread is allowed to slip down into the fork and the tool is then lifted upwards, allowing the blade to rip through the thread. Once the seam has been undone in this way the loose ends can be removed and the seam resewn.

It is unclear when the modern seam ripper was invented; an 1898 patent for a device roughly similar in shape uses the phrase "seam ripper" and claims to be an improvement on what was standard at the time.

== See also ==
- Knit picker
- US patent 604675A, Fisher, John Edward, issued 1898-05-24
