= Singe =

Slight scorching, burn or treatment with flame

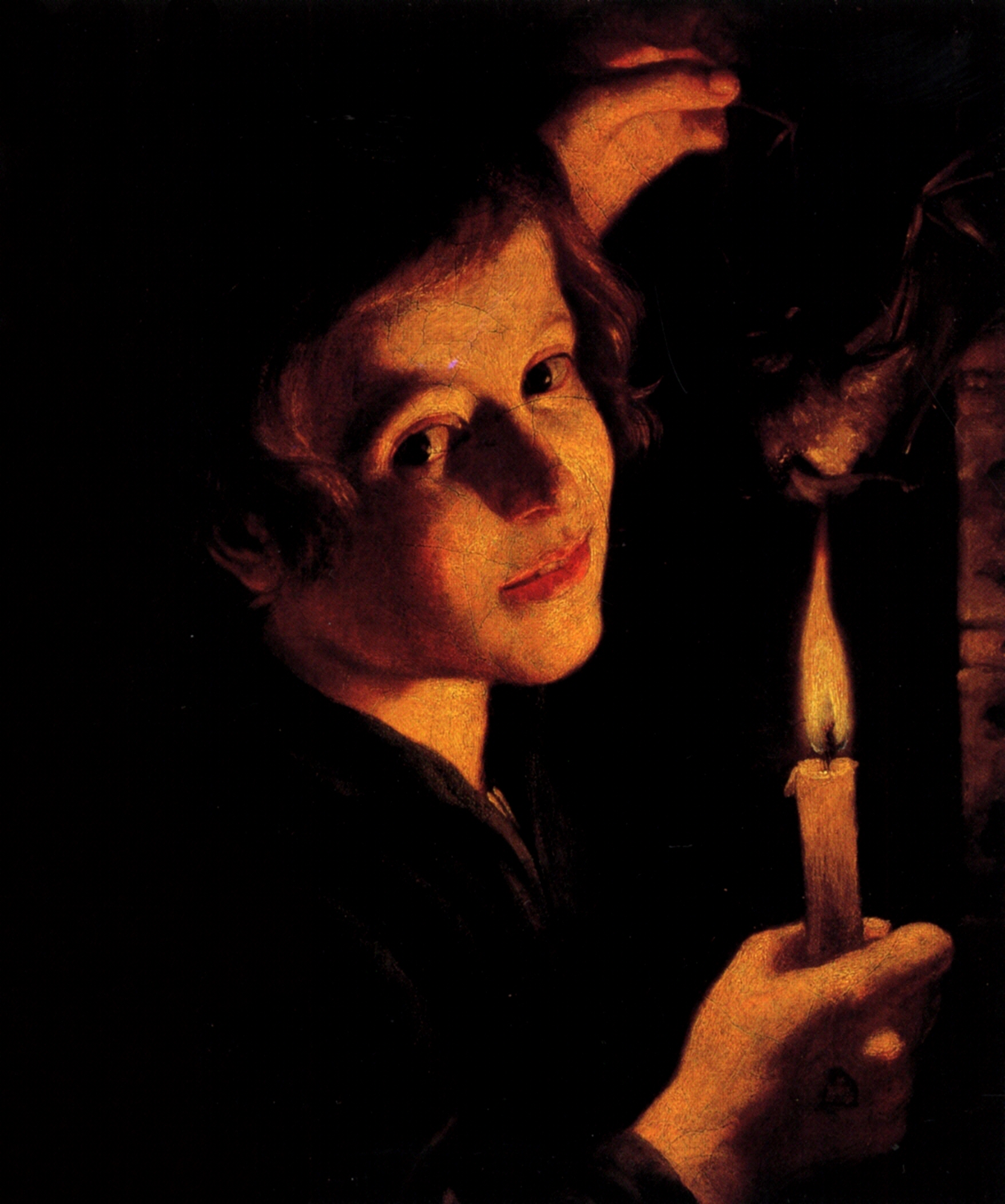
Boy singeing a bat's wings, by Trophime Bigot

A singe is a slight scorching, burn or treatment by flame. This may be due to an accident, such as scorching one's hair when lighting a gas fire, or a deliberate method of treatment or removal of hair or other fibres.

== Hairdressing ==
A singe is a treatment available at a barber's. A lit taper (candle) or other device is used to lightly burn and shrivel the hair. The practice of singeing was popular approximately a century ago; it was believed that hair had "fluid" in it and singeing would trap the fluid in. Singeing is supposed to have beneficial effects – sealing cut ends, closing up the follicles, preventing the hair from bleeding (a belief that has since been debunked) and encouraging it to grow. Singeing is still sometimes used to bond natural hair to hair extensions.

Pre-industrialised cultures have also used singeing as a means to trim scalp or body hair, as a part of normal grooming or during ritual activity.

Sir Francis Drake was famously said to have figuratively "singed the King of Spain's beard" when he raided Cadiz and burnt the Spanish fleet.

== Agriculture ==
In the agricultural industry, both poultry and pork are singed (after slaughter) to remove stub feathers and bristles during processing for packaging for sale and consumption. Kiwifruit vine leaders and canes are sometimes singed as a treatment for Pseudomonas syringae bacterial infection.

== Textiles ==
In the textile industry, loose fibres protruding on the surface of textile goods are singed to remove them. When done to fabrics containing cotton, this results in increased wetting, better dyeing characteristics, improved reflection, no "frosty" appearance, a smoother surface, better clarity in printing, improved visibility of the fabric structure, less pilling and decreased contamination through removal of fluff and lint.

The process is usually to pass one or both sides of a fabric over a gas flame to burn off the protruding fibres. Other methods include infra-red or heat for thermoplastic fibers. Singeing of yarns is called "gassing". It is usually the first step after weaving or knitting, though the fabric may be brushed first to raise the surface fibres.

Cellulose fibres such as cotton are easily singed because the protruding fibers burn to a light ash which is easily removed. Thermoplastic fibres are harder to singe because they melt and form hard residues on the fabric surface.

== See also ==
- Cauterization
