= Decatising =

Industrial finishing treatment for cloth

Decatising or decatizing, also known as crabbing, blowing, and decating, is the process of making permanent a textile finish on a cloth, so that it does not shrink during garment making.

== Origin ==
The word comes from the French décatir, which means to remove the cati or finish of the wool. Though used mainly for wool, the term is also applied to processes performed on fabrics of other fibers, such as cotton, linen or polyester.

== Process ==
Crabbing and blowing are minor variations on the general process for wool, which is to roll the cloth onto a roller and blow steam through it.

Decatized wool fabric is interleaved with a cotton, polyester/cotton or polyester fabric and rolled up onto a perforated decatizing drum under controlled tension. The fabric is steamed for up to ten minutes and then cooled down by drawing ambient air through the fabric roll. The piece is then reversed and steamed again in order to ensure that an even treatment is achieved.

There are several quite different types of wool decatizing machines including batch decatizing machines, continuous decatizing machines, wet decatising machines and dry decatizing machines.

In the 1920s, James Bailey textile engineers (Slaithwaite, Yorkshire) developed a successful and efficient means of batch decatising by putting two blowing machines back to back. This design meant you could process two pieces simultaneously, and run long pieces through in one go. These were used by most if not every woollen & worsted finishers in the UK, and became the mainstay of Batch blowers throughout the mid 20th century.

In the 1940s, they re-designed it as the Bailey 'Empire blowing, steaming or decatising machine' advertising a new design, better finish, increased output, and less steam consumption. This design sold well, as they were simply the best built and most effective machines in the world at the time. In the UK, these machines are still used to this day at worsted cloth finishers.

Crabbing (sometimes called greasy blowing) is a type of special decatising done mostly to worsted fabrics of a higher twist in the 'grey state', or when they come off the weaving loom. It was one of the first step in the traditional finishing process of fine worsted cloths in the UK, after it is weighed. The objective of crabbing is to achieve a 'preliminary set' on the cloth before it is scoured/washed in soap. This stabilizes the cloth in place during the washing and milling process and can prevent warping, cockling and distortions occurring. This can happen because of the high twist in the yarn.

Wet Decatising (essentially boiling) Is a more unusual method which is used to impart a face finish on certain Woollen cloths, like doeskin which was historically used as an army uniforming fabric. In this process, cloth which at this point has been washed and dried is rolled into a steam bath and boiled for several minutes whilst submerged in a wrapper fabric which is sewn onto the end of the piece and inter layered with the cloth. It is then run off into a cold water bath where the lustre or ‘sheen’ imparted in the boiling process is set as the fabric is cooled down.
