= Snag (textiles) =

Qualitative property of textiles

In textiles, a snag is created when a sharp or rough object pulls, plucks, scratches, or drags a group of fibres, yarn, or a yarn segment from its normal pattern.

== Types ==
Snags can be classified into three types:

1. Snags that have a protrusion and no distortion,
2. Snags that have distortion and no protrusion,
3. Snags that have both protrusion and distortion.

Objects that often cause snags are rough fingernails, toenails, or hangnails.

When a snag occurs in certain fine textiles like pantyhose, it is called a run. This is because the snag breaks at least one fibre, causing the knit to come undone in a line which runs up the grain of the fabric.

In clothing, snags can also occur in coarse textiles like sweaters, or in certain types of sport jerseys such as for soccer (football). These are common in synthetic fabrics like polyester, which have extremely fine fibres even when they are used to make coarser fabrics.

== Repair ==
Snags of this type (#3) may sometimes be repaired or minimized by firmly pressing with opposed finger and thumb at each end of the pulled thread (to prevent it from pulling further from each side), and gently pulling apart the bunched fabric, allowing the bunched fibers at the site of the snag to be drawn back in. Holding one end this way with one hand and using two fingers of the other hand on one side of the fabric (opposing the thumb on the other side) while slowly drawing them toward the snag site may also accomplish this. Any remaining fibres still protruding can then be trimmed off to keep them from snagging again.

== Other uses ==
The same characteristics which make polyester fabrics prone to snags also lead it to be used for Halloween. Artificial cobwebs are produced that can be stretched over objects for wikt:spooky/spooky effect. This stays in place because it snags on objects like shrubs or pushpins. Artificial spiders (often supplied in the same package) and other objects can in turn be snagged into the cobweb.

Other things can also snag on various objects. A fishing line can snag on a tree, for example. Similarly, a dead tree is also called a snag, as it can catch boaters (or hikers) off-guard. The term is also used colloquially to describe any unexpected circumstance which causes a delay in a project or any given situation.

== See also ==
- Pill (textile)
