= Scouring (textiles) =

Chemical washing process

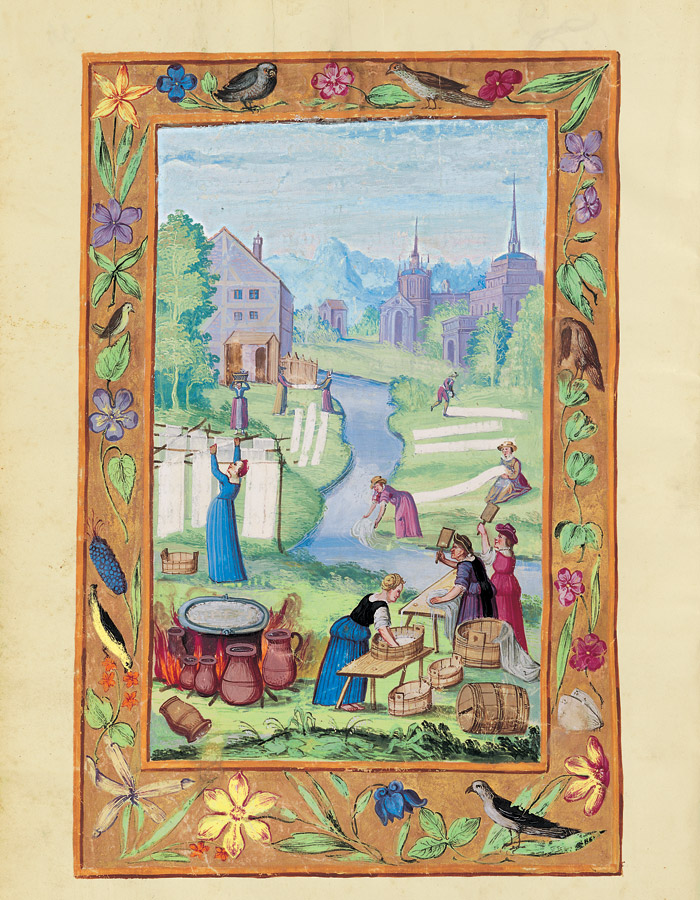
Women washing clothes

Scouring is a preparatory treatment of certain textile materials. Scouring removes soluble and insoluble impurities found in textiles as natural, added and adventitious impurities: for example, oils, waxes, fats, vegetable matter, as well as dirt. Removing these contaminants through scouring prepares the textiles for subsequent processes such as bleaching and dyeing. Though a general term, "scouring" is most often used for wool. In cotton, it is synonymously called "boiling out", and in silk, and "boiling off".

== Purpose of scouring ==
Scouring is an essential pre-treatment for the subsequent finishing stages that include bleaching, dyeing, and printing. Raw and unfinished textiles contain a significant amount of impurities, both natural and foreign. It is necessary to eliminate these impurities to make the products ready for later steps in textile manufacturing. For instance, fatty substances and waxy matters are the major barriers in the hydrophilicity of the natural fibers. Absorbency helps the penetration of chemicals in the stages such as dyeing and printing or finishing of the textiles. These fats and waxy substances are converted into soluble salts with the help of alkali. This treatment is called Saponification.

=== Impurities ===
Foreign matter in addition to fiber is known as "impurities." Textile fibers contain many types of impurities. e.g.:

- Natural impurities: Impurities gathered from the natural environment by the fibres. Natural impurities also include non-fibrous parts that are incorporated into the fiber during its growth. Notably, these are not present in synthetic fibres, which are manufactured artificially.
- Added: Oils and waxes during spinning, crocheting or knitting or weaving.
- Accidental: dirt or mishandling, foreign contaminants.

The impurities in different natural fibers
Fiber type	Impurities in %age	Source
Wool	40-50	
Cotton	10	
Silk	22-30	

== Etymology, and history ==
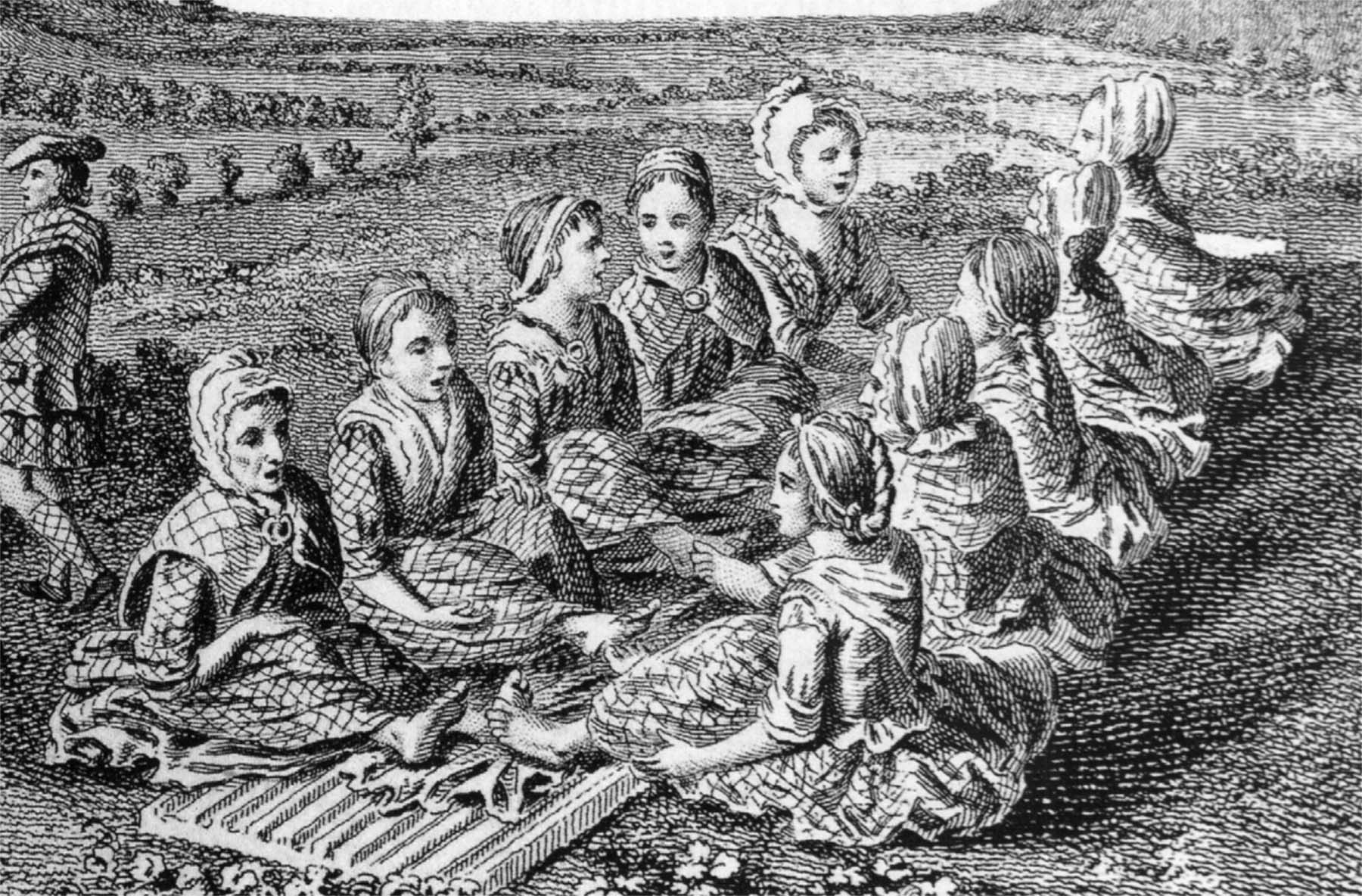
Detail of engraving showing Scotswomen singing a waulking song while walking or fulling cloth, 1772 (from Pennant's Tour).

=== Etymology ===
The term "scouring" refers to the "act of cleaning with a rubbing action".

=== History ===
Textile manufacturing was once an everyday household activity. In Europe, women were often involved in textile manufacturing. They used to spin, weave, process, and finish the products they needed at home. In the pre-industrial era, scouring (wool scouring) was a part of the fulling process of cloth making, in which the cloths were cleaned, and then milled (a thickening process). Fulling used to be done by pounding the woolen cloth with a club, or by the fuller's feet or hands. This process was associated with waulking songs, which were sung by women in the Scottish Gaelic tradition to set the pace.

=== Earliest scouring agents ===
Scouring agents are the cleaning agents that remove the impurities from the textiles during the scouring process. While these are now industrially-produced, scouring agents were once produced locally; lant or stale urine and lixivium, a solution of alkaline salts extracted from wood ashes, were among the earliest scouring agents. Lant, which contains ammonium carbonate, was used to scour the wool.

== Wool scouring ==
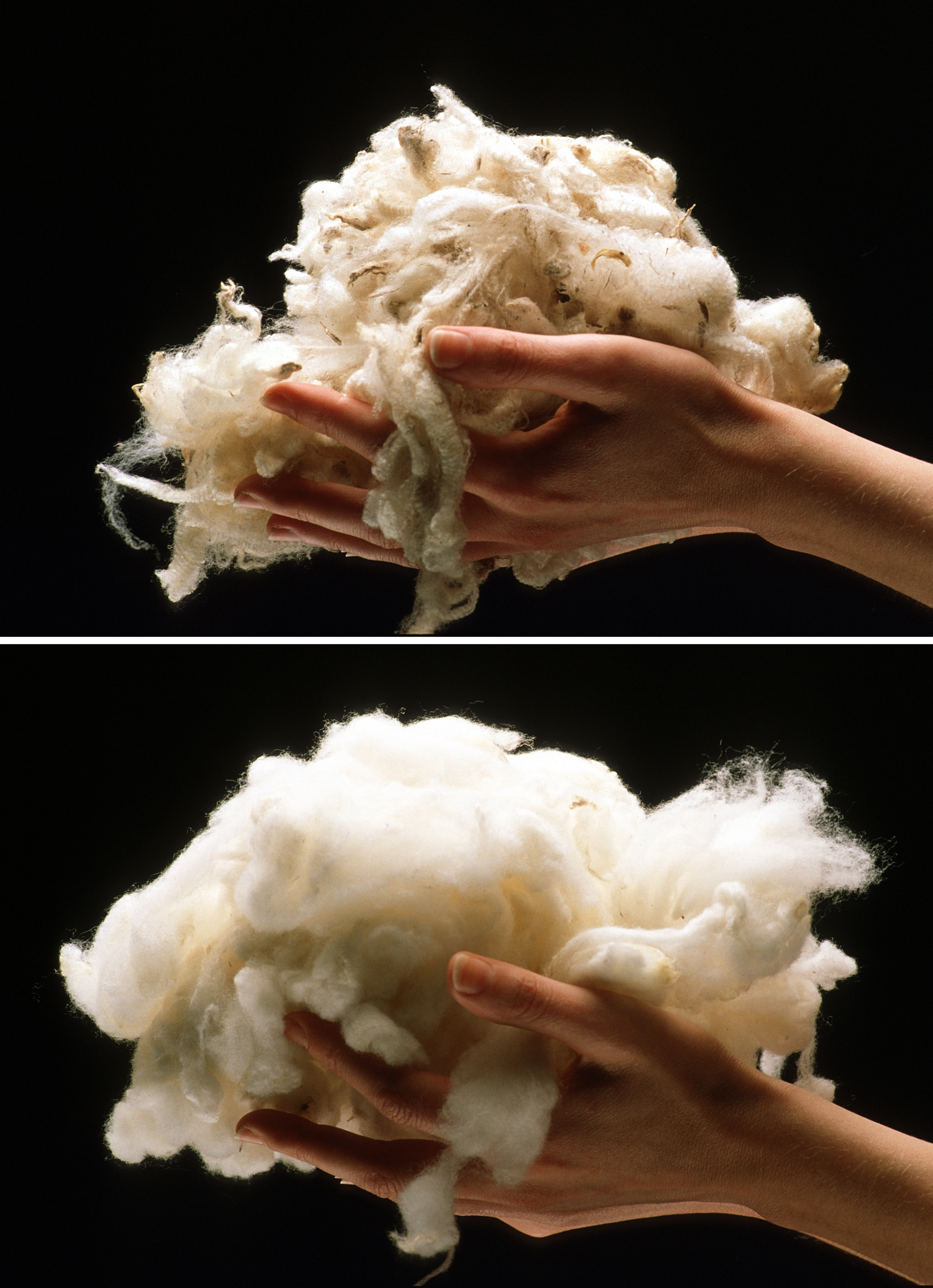
Wool, before and after scouring

The removal of lanolin, vegetable materials and other wool contaminants before use is an example of wool scouring. Wool scouring is the next process after the woollen fleece of a sheep is cut off. Raw wool is also known as ''Greasy wool.''

"Grease" or "yolk'' is a combined form of dried sweat, oil and fatty matter. Lanolin is the major component (5-25%) of raw wool which is a waxy substance secreted by the sebaceous glands of wool-bearing animals. Greasy matter varies by breed. Following the cleaning process, the wool fibers possess a chemical composition of keratin.

Typical wool impurities
Type of impurity	In Merino	In crossbreed
Dirt or soil	19%	8%
Grease	16%	11%
Suint (perspiration residue)	6%	8%

=== Process ===
Three steps comprise the complete cleaning process for wool: steeping, scouring, and rinsing.

==== Steeping ====
Potash and wool fat are two beneficial substances among the contaminants in wool, necessitating the development of specific cleaning techniques capable of recovering these compounds. Steeping is an alternative scouring process, In steeping system, scouring entails in parts. Wool steeping is carried out in stages such as immersing it in lukewarm water for many hours. When the wool includes only a little amount of yolk, the steeping method for recovering the yolk can be skipped.

==== Scouring treatment ====
Scouring is the process of cleaning wool that makes it free from grease, suint (residue from perspiration), dead skin and dirt and vegetable matter present as impurities in the wool. It may consist of a simple boiling of wool in water or an industrial process of treating wool with alkalis and detergents (or soap and Sodium carbonate.) Bath temperature is maintained (at 65 degree Celsius) to melt wool grease. (Lanolin melts at a temperature of 38-44 °C.)

The next treatment is carbonization, a treatment with strong acids that convert vegetable matter into carbon.

==== Rinsing ====
Rinsing is the process of thoroughly washing the cleaned wool.

=== Alternative method ===
The alternative method is solvent scouring.

==== Solvent method ====
Solvent scouring of wool replaces soap, detergent, and alkalies with a solvent liquid such as carbon tetrachloride, ether, petroleum naphtha, chloroform, benzene, trichloroethylene, or carbon disulfide, etc. These liquids are capable of dissolving impurities but highly volatile, often toxic and flammable. Hence, they need extra care in handling.

=== Gallery ===
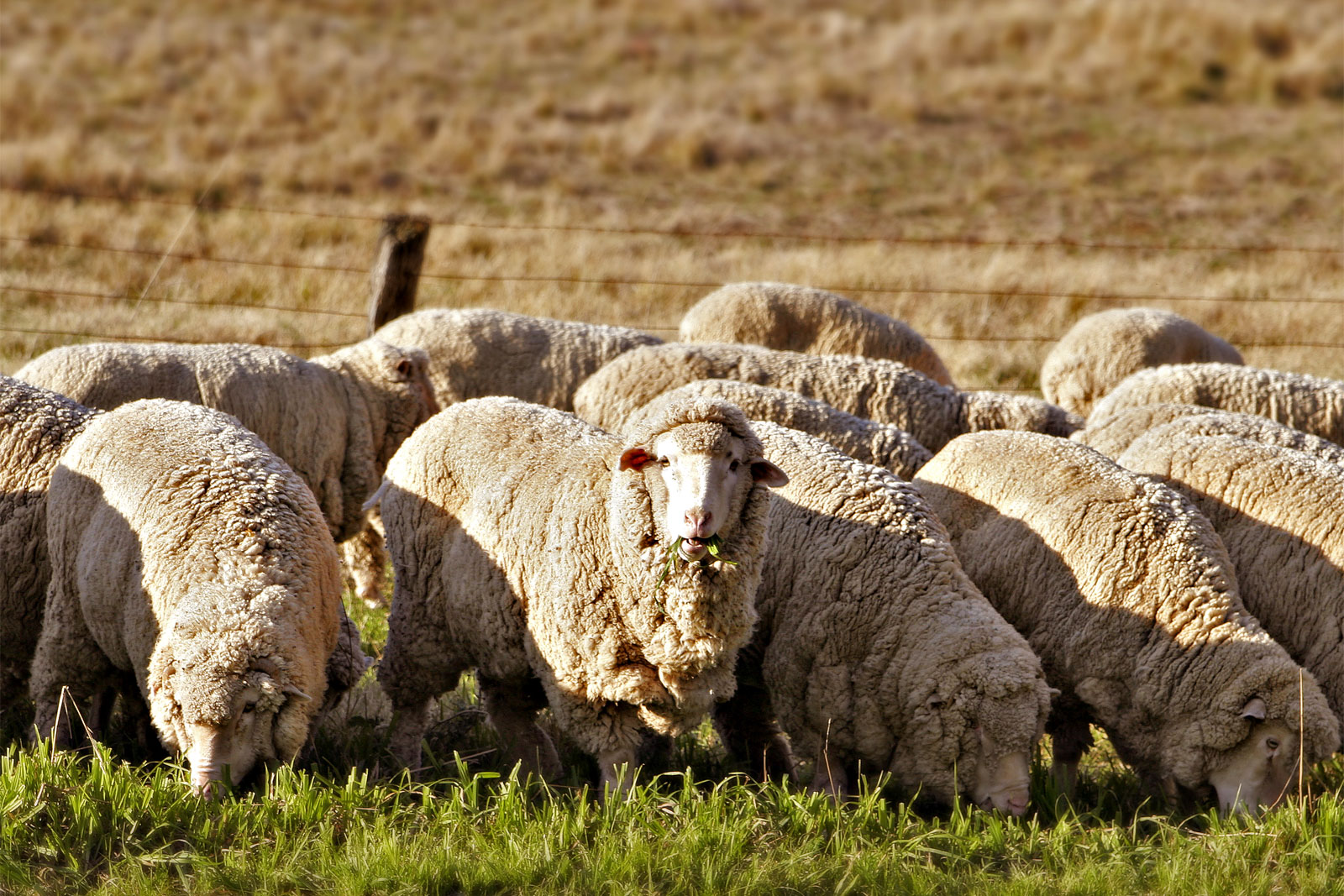
Australian Merino sheep

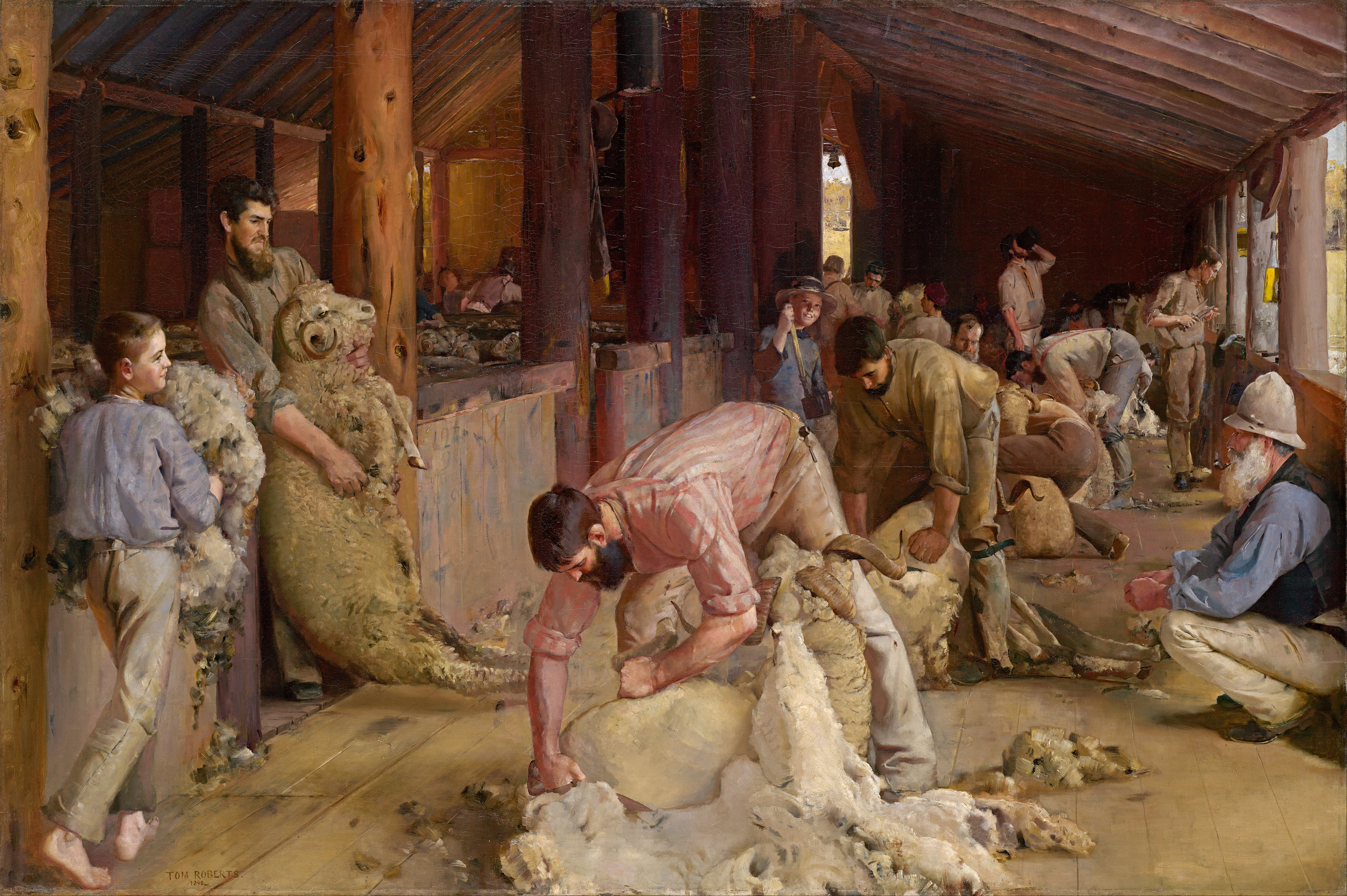
Sheep shearing

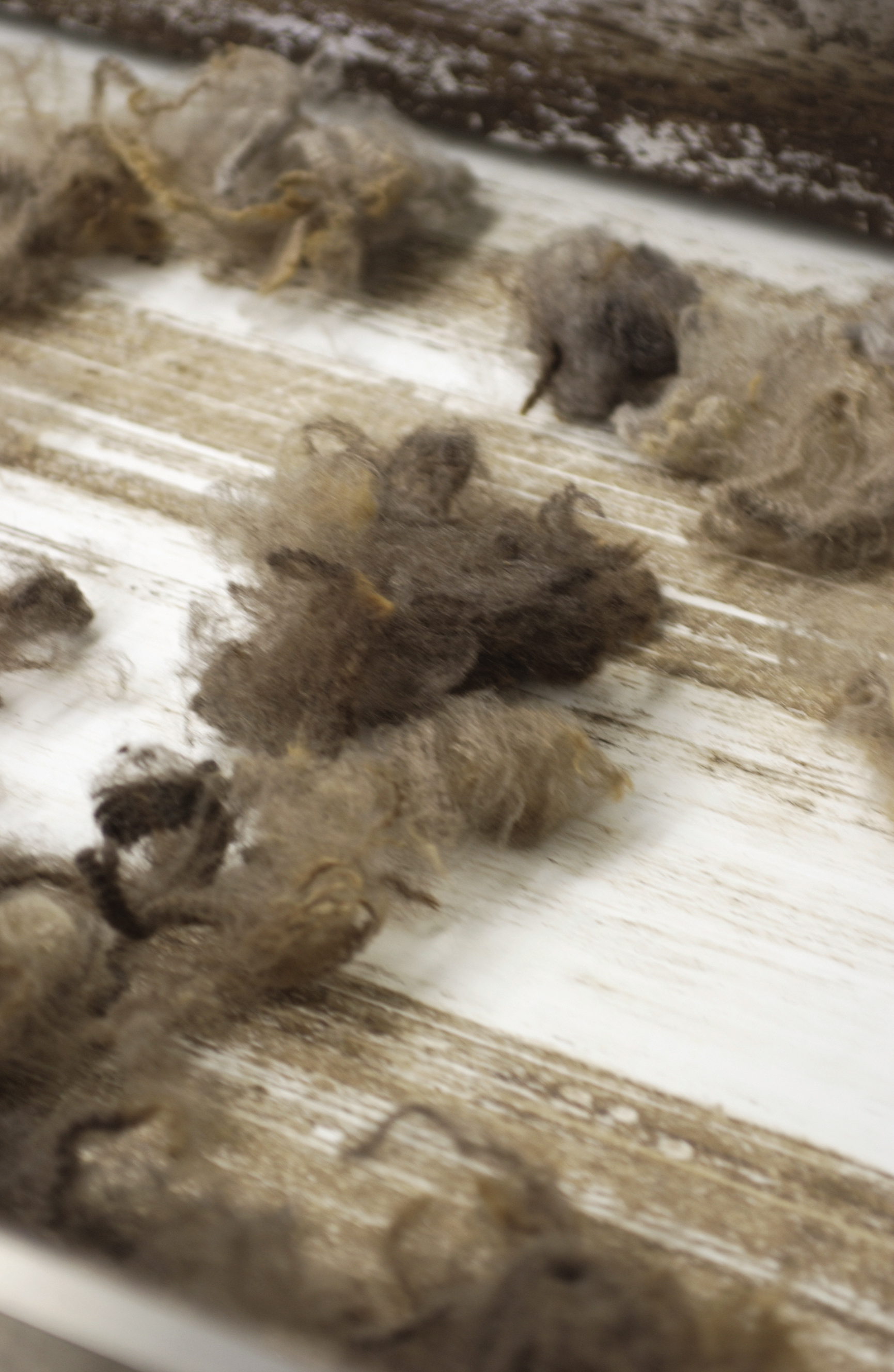
Unscoured wool

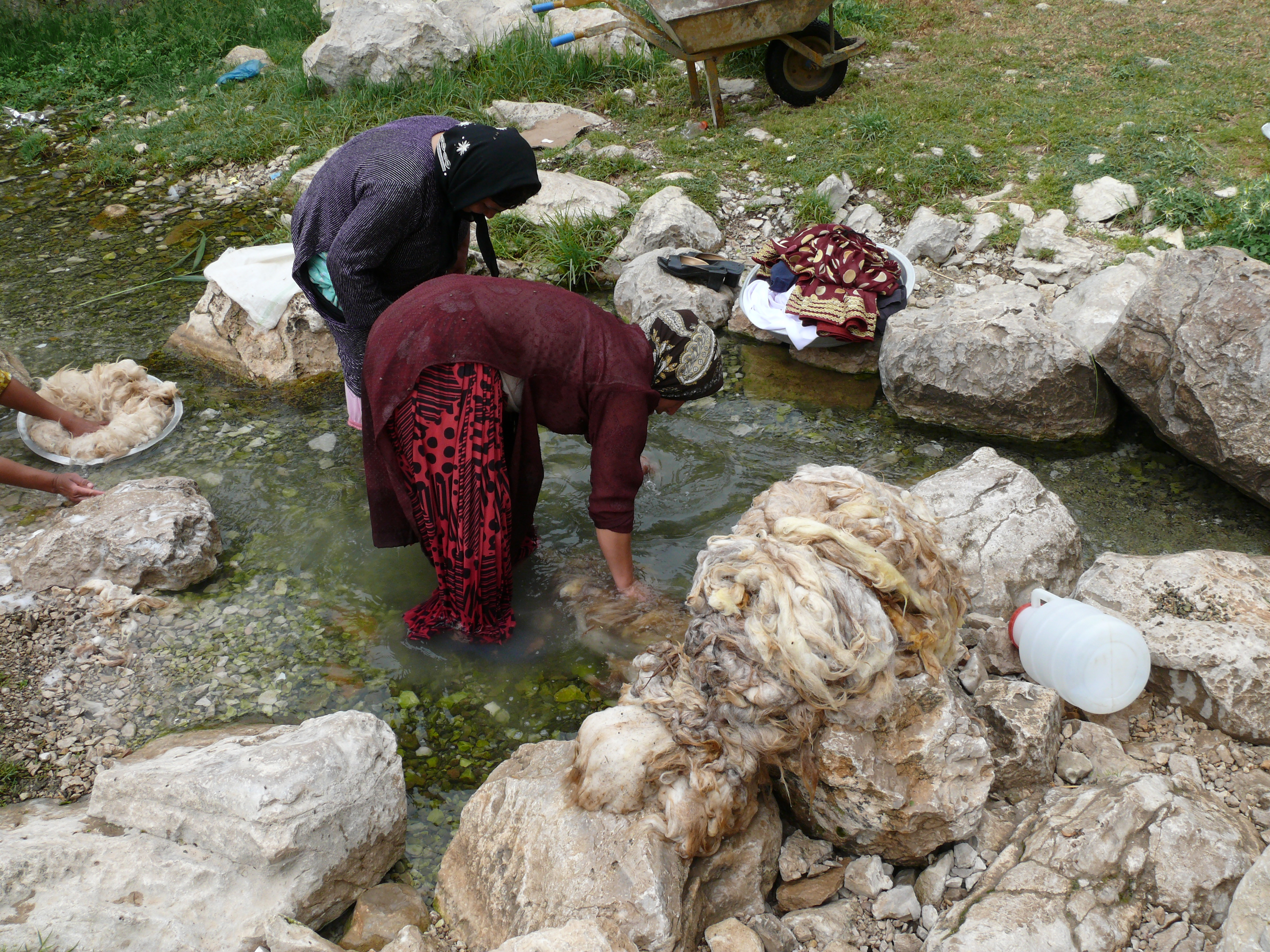
Qashqhaï women (nomadic shepherds) washing the just harvested wool. Sarab-e Bahram, Area of Noorabad, Fars, Iran, April 2007

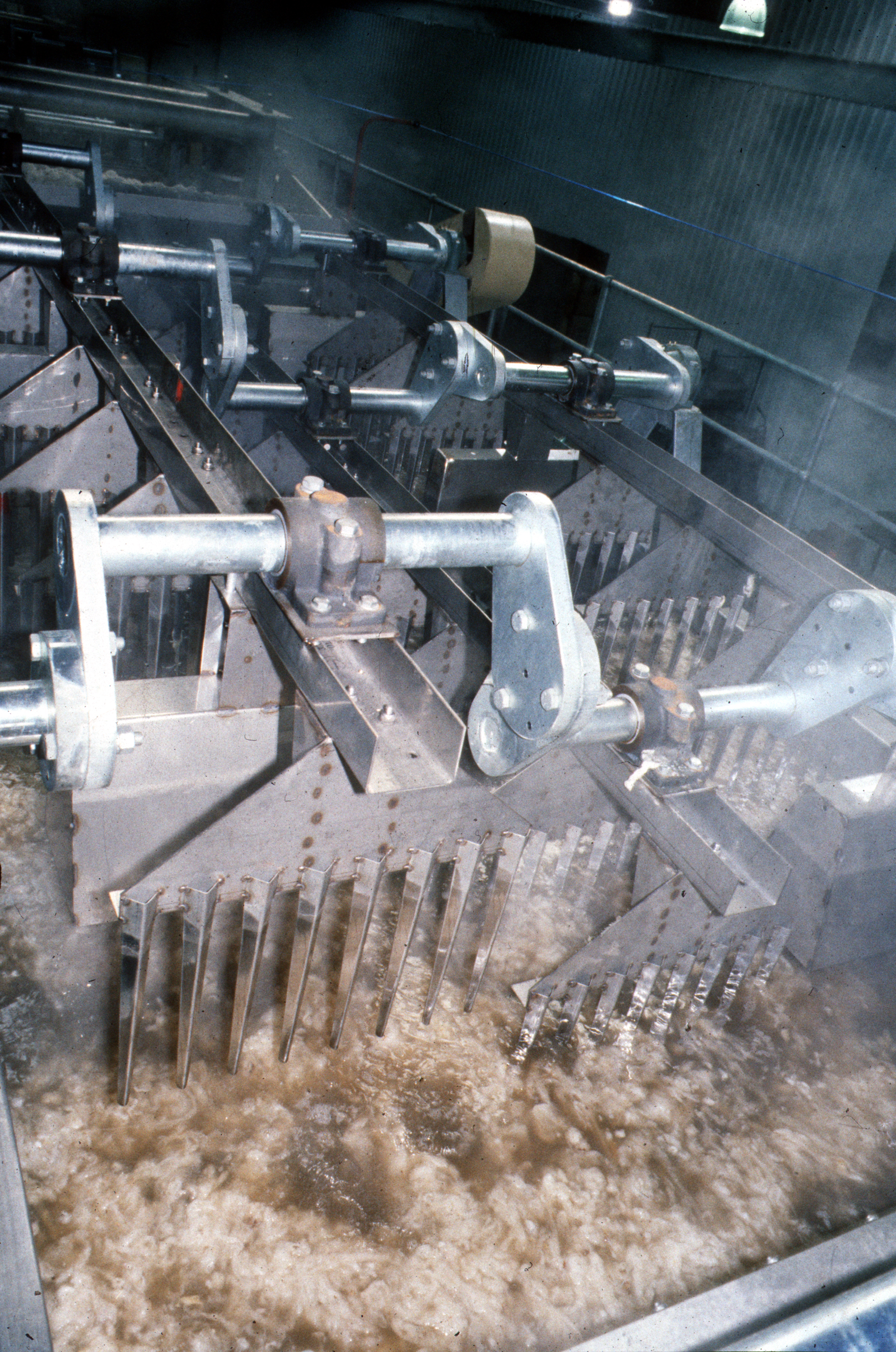
Wool scouring in the machine

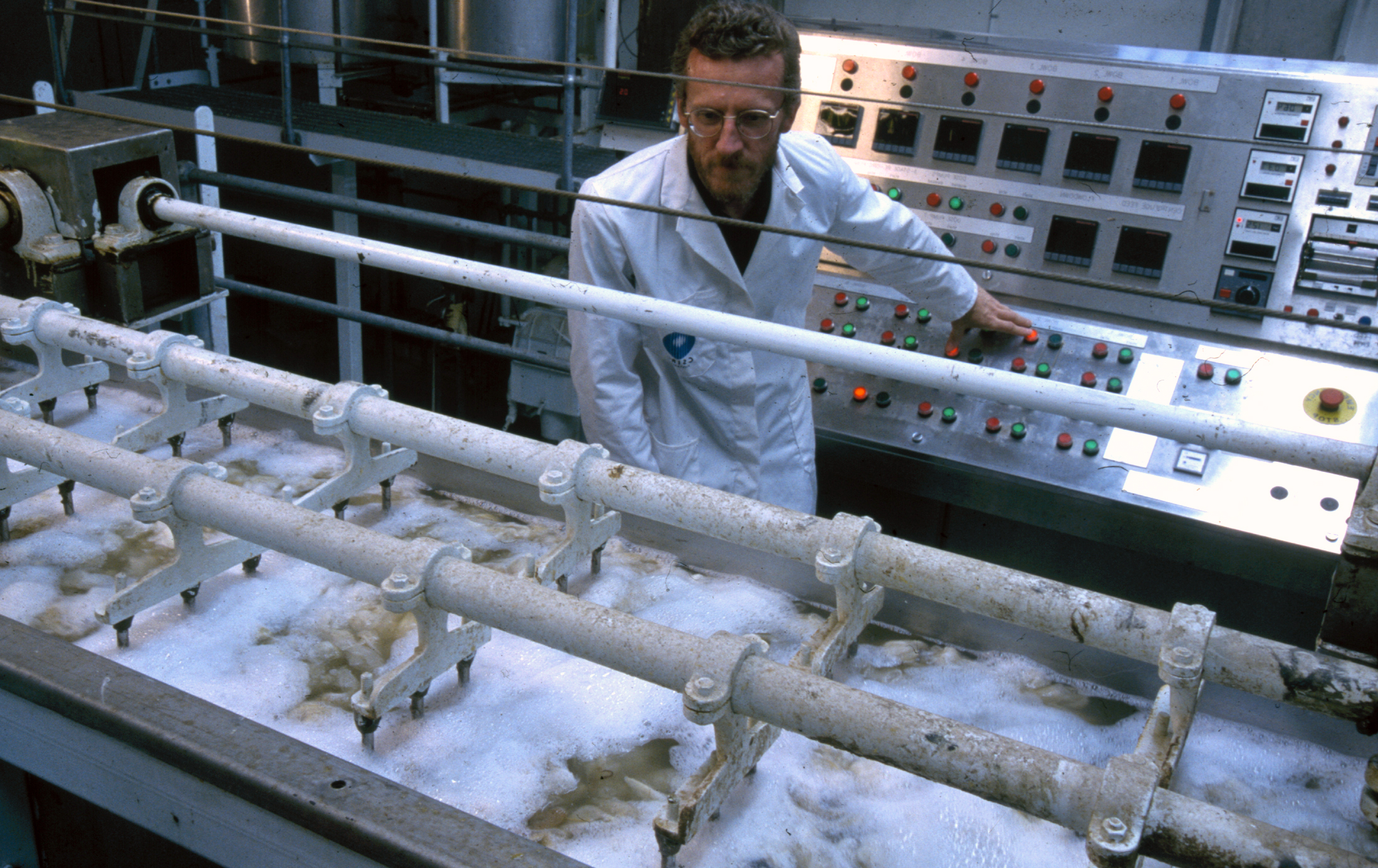
Wool scouring in the machine, technician monitoring wool scouring process

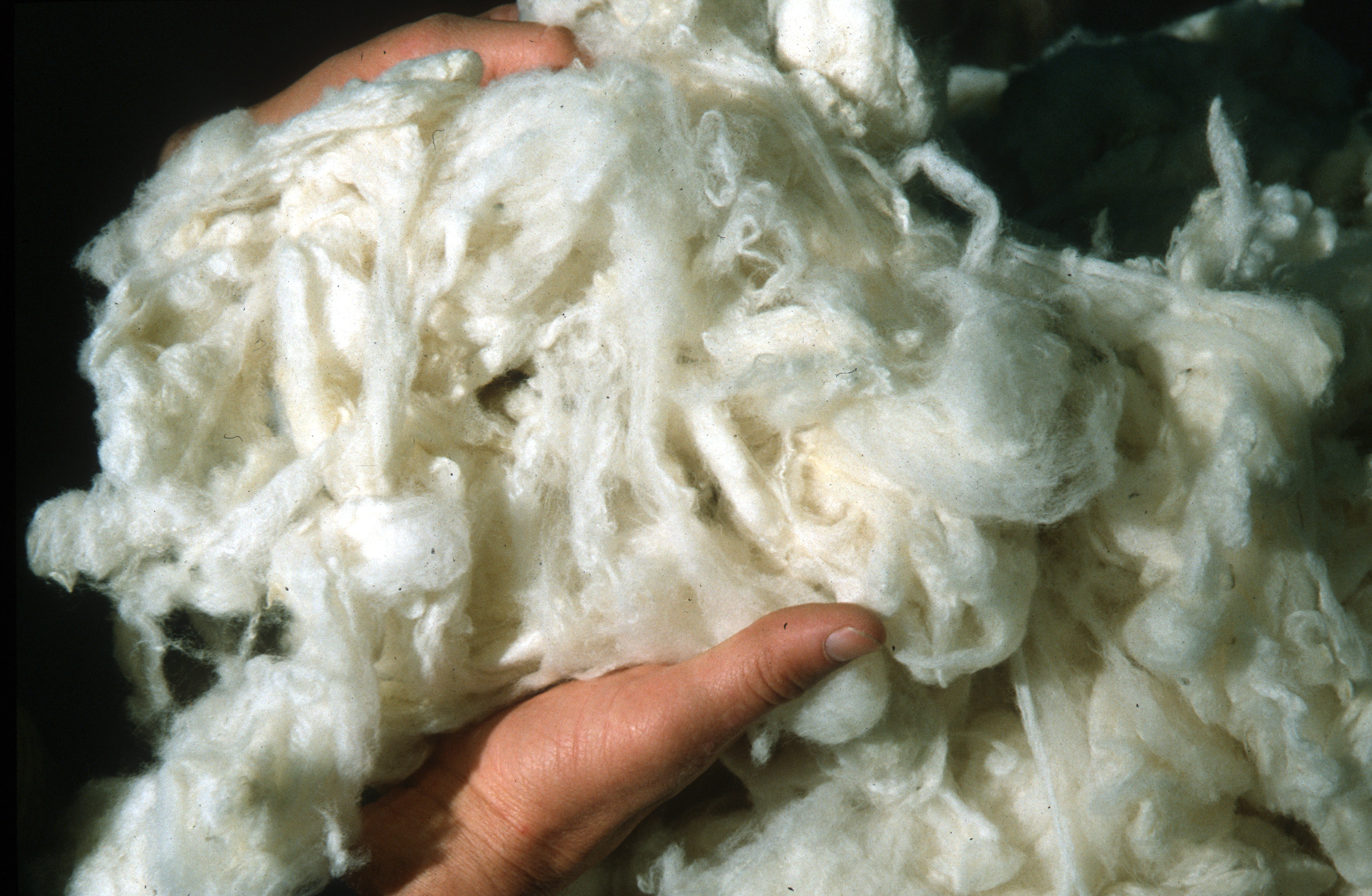
Scoured wool

== Cotton scouring ==
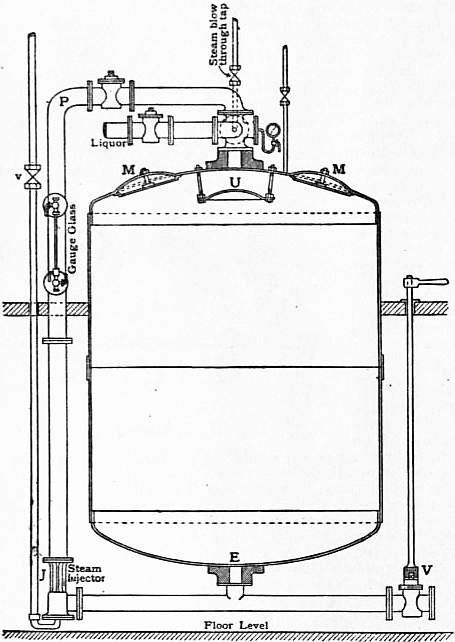
High Pressure Blow-through Kier was used for Scouring

In cotton, non-cellulosic substances such as waxes, lipids, pectic substances, organic acids contribute to around ten percent of the weight. Cotton, in particular, has fewer impurities than wool. Cotton scouring refers to removing impurities such as natural wax, pectins, and non-fibrous matter with a wetting agent and caustic soda. In comparison, alkaline boiling has no effect on cellulose.

=== Impurities in cotton ===
Cotton Pectins, waxes, proteins, mineral compounds, and ash, etc.

The major impurities in cotton
Type of impurity	%age
Pectins	0.4-1.2
Wax	0.4-1.2
Others	1.7

=== Methods ===
==== Discontinuous scouring ====
In discontinuous method certain machines are used such as dyeing vessels, winches, jiggers and Kier.

===== Kier boiling =====
Kier is a large cylindrical vessel, upright, with egg shaped ends made of boilerplate that has a capacity of treating one to three tonnes of material at a time.

Kier boiling and ''Boiling off'' is the scouring process that involves boiling the materials with the caustic solution in the Kier, which is an enclosed vessel, so that the fabric can boil under pressure. Open kiers were also used with temperatures below 100 °C (at atmospheric pressure).

===== Biotechnology =====
Biotechnology in textiles is the advanced way of processing, textiles, it contributes to numerous treatments of cellulosic materials such as desizing, denim washing, biopolishing, and scouring, etc.

====== Scouring with enzymes ======
Enzymes are helpful in bio-singeing, bio-scouring and removing impurities from cotton, which is more environmentally friendly. Biopolishing is an alternative method that is an enzymetic treatment to clean the surface of cellulosic fabrics or yarns. It is also named ''Biosingeing.'' Pectinase enzymes, breaks down pectin, a polysaccharide found in cellulosic materials such as cotton.

=== Gallery ===
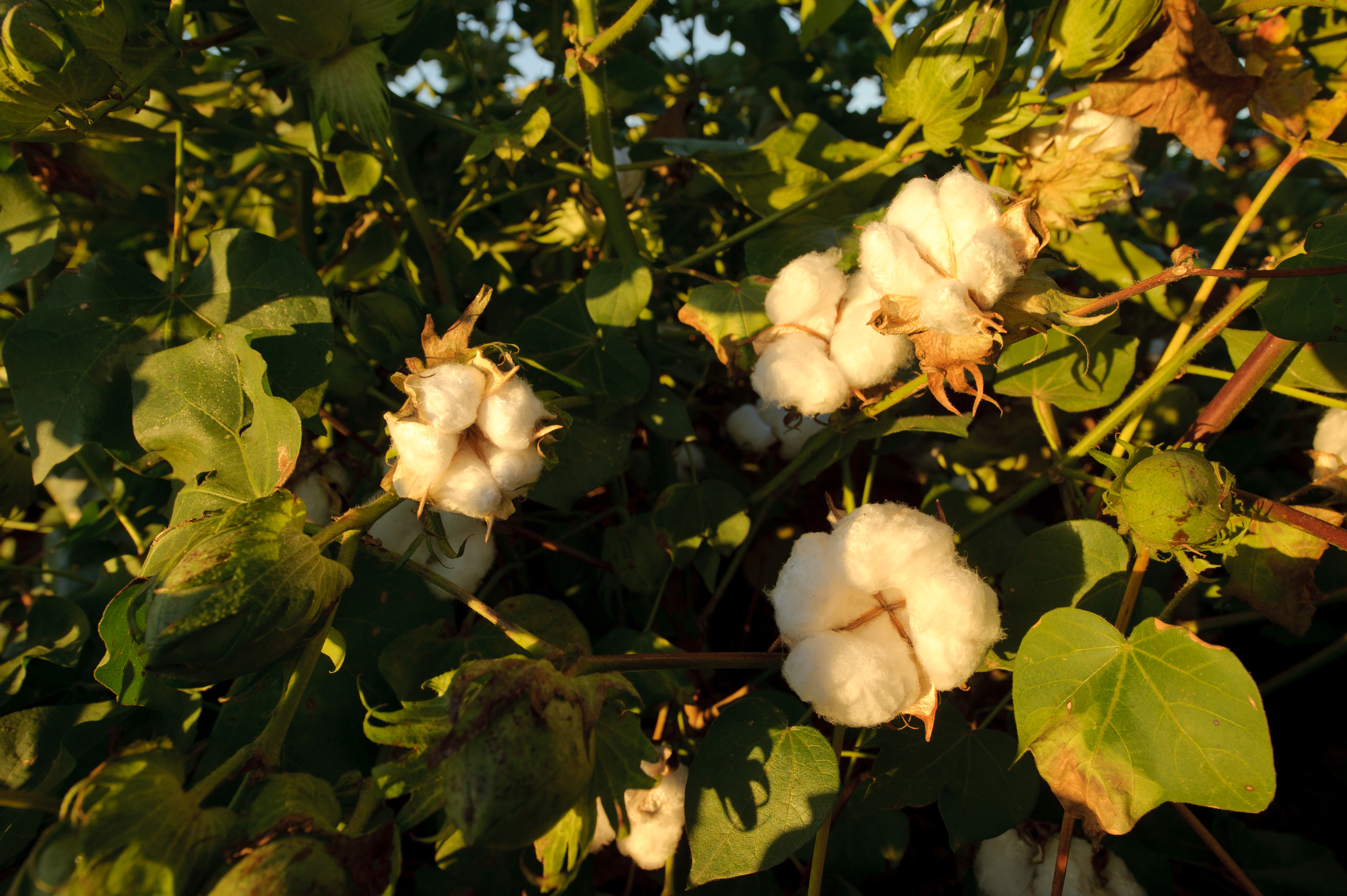
cotton plant

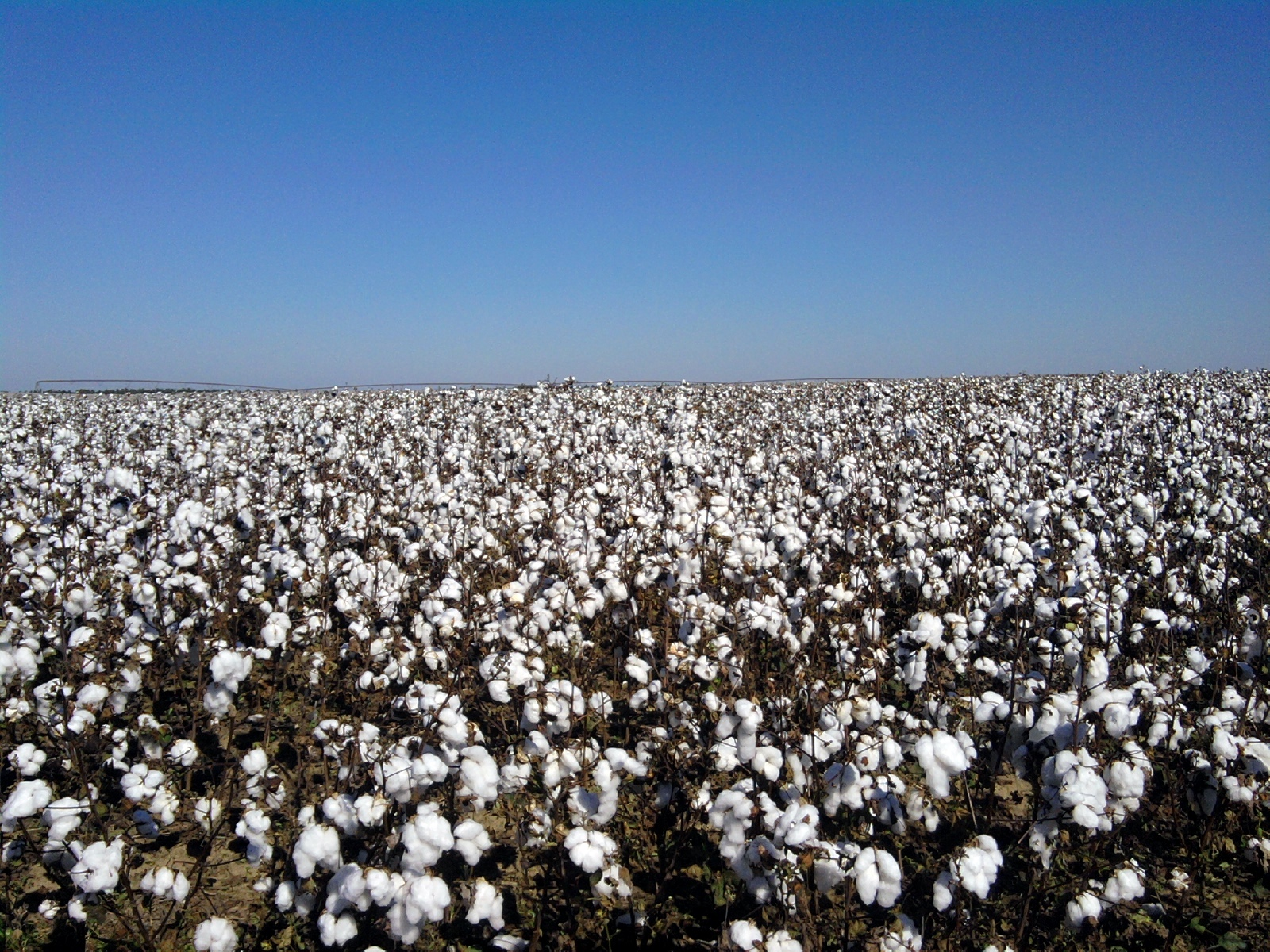
Cotton farm

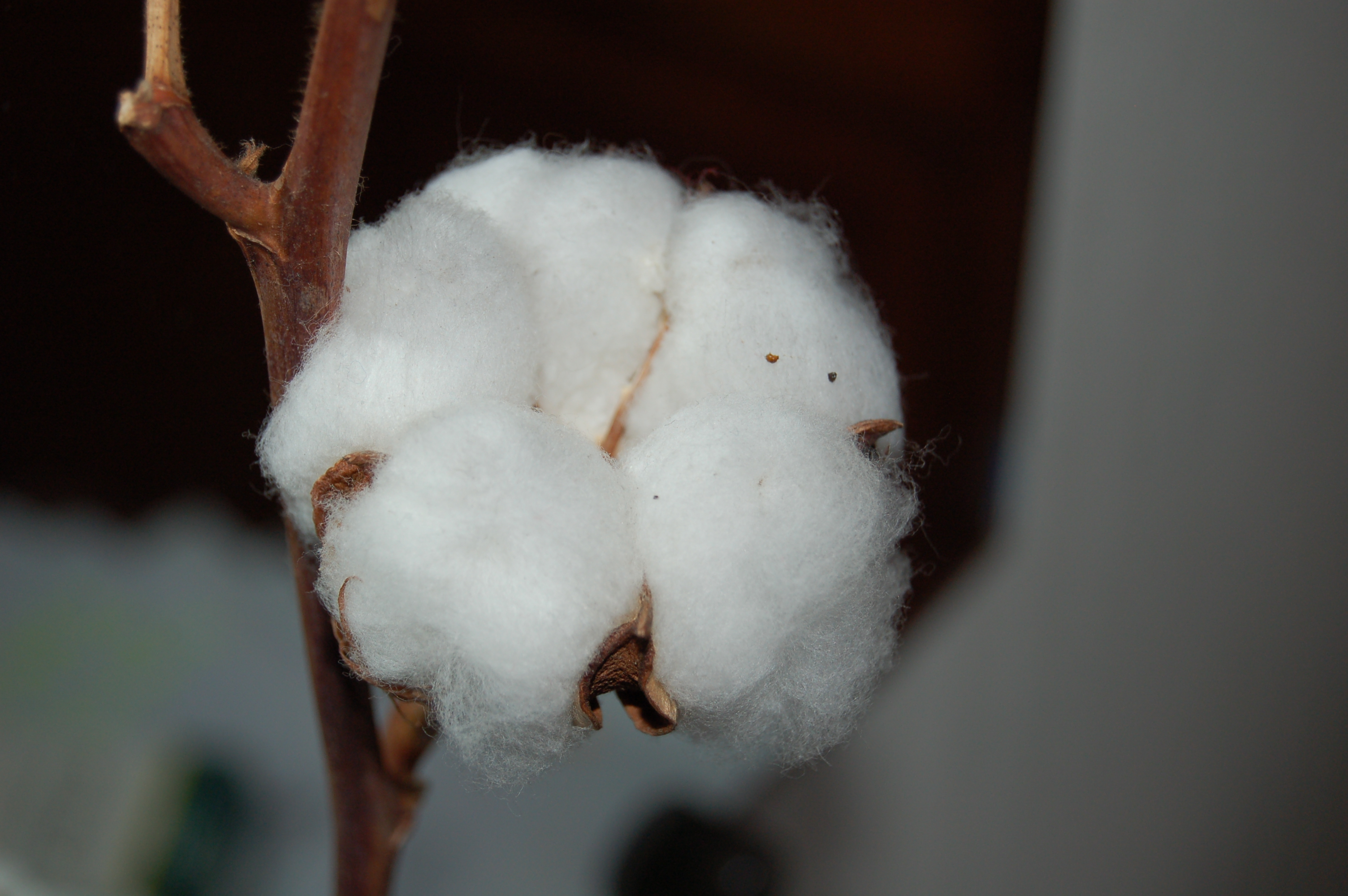
Cotton boll

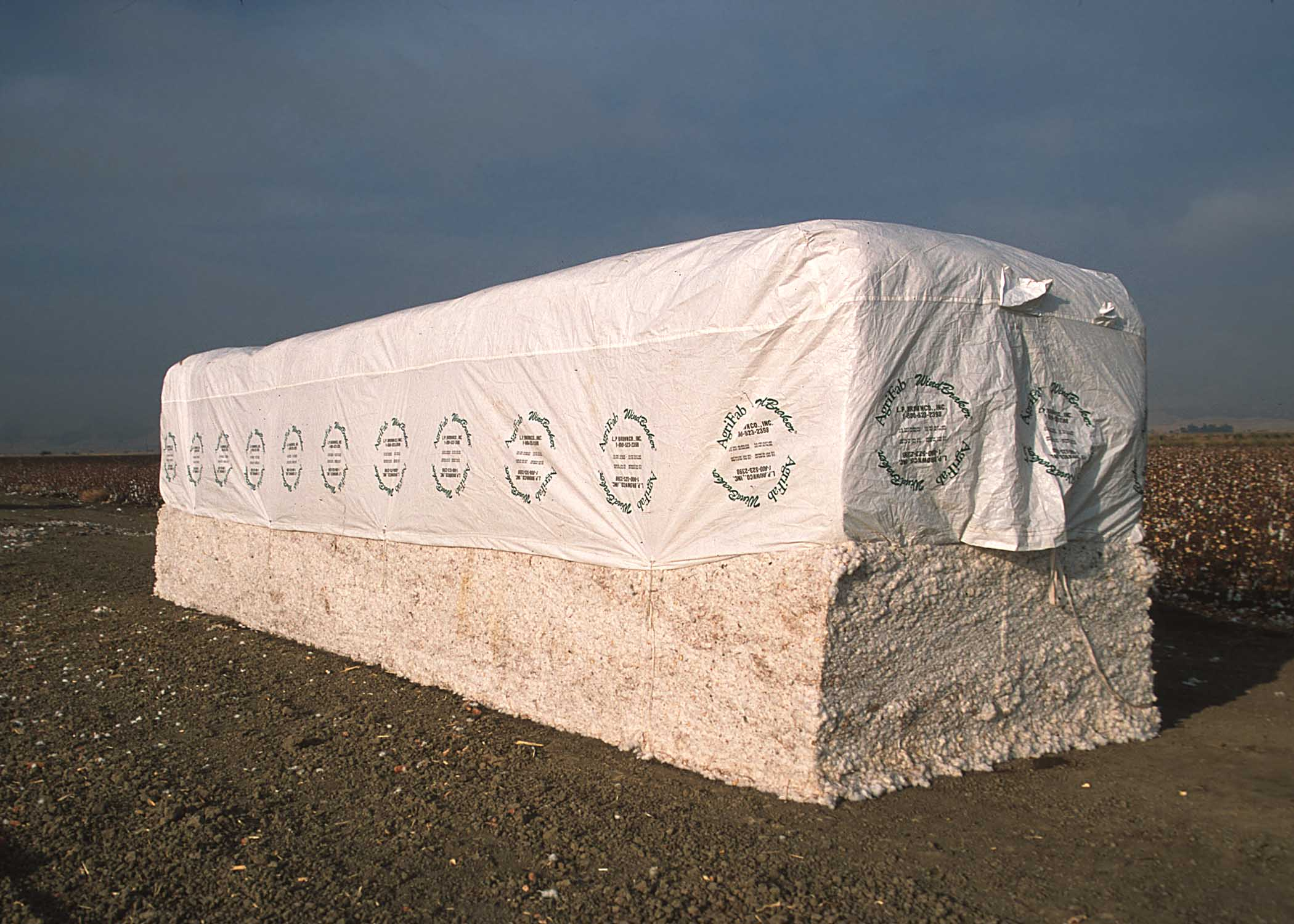
cotton ready to bale and transported to the mills

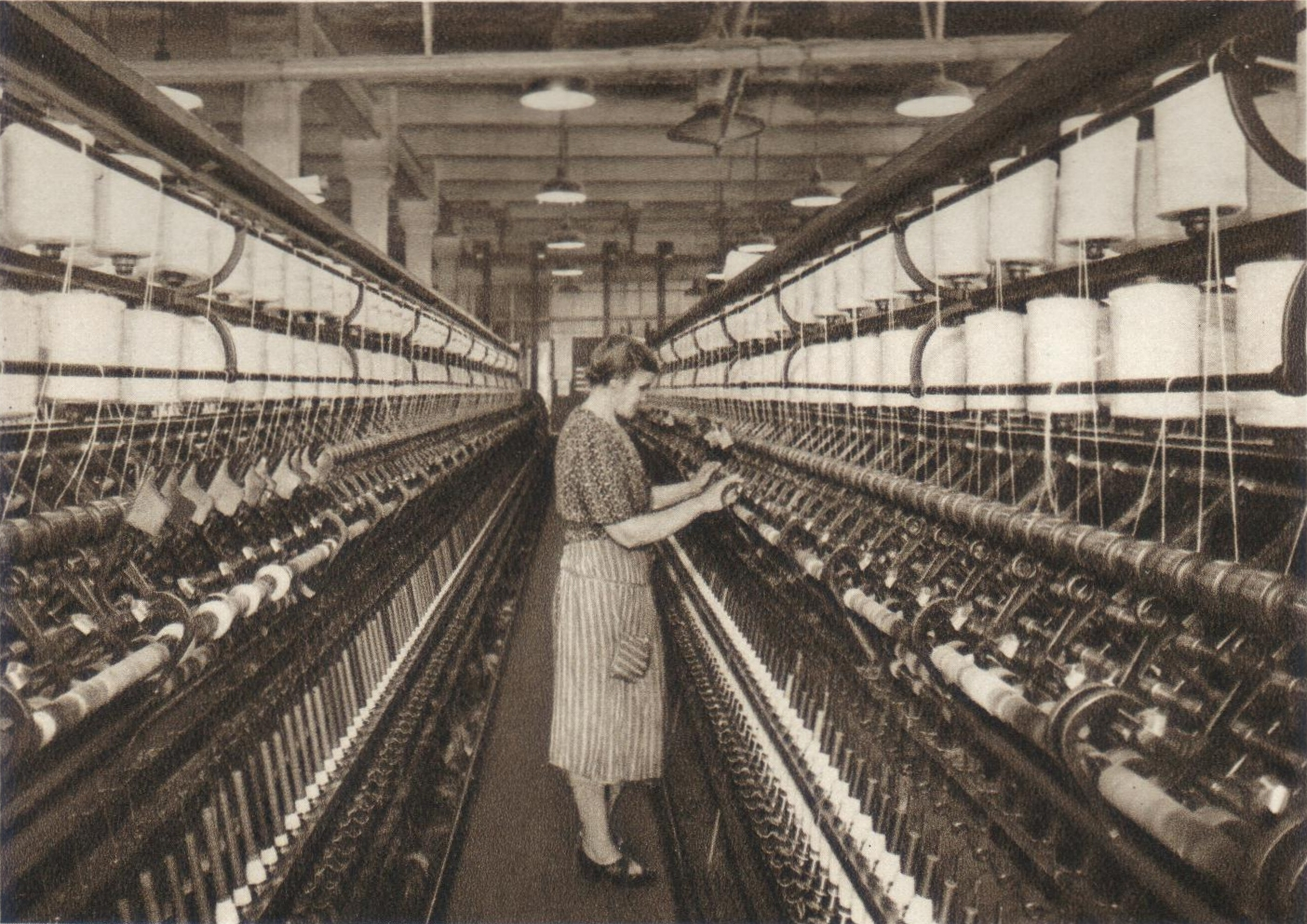
Yarn spinning

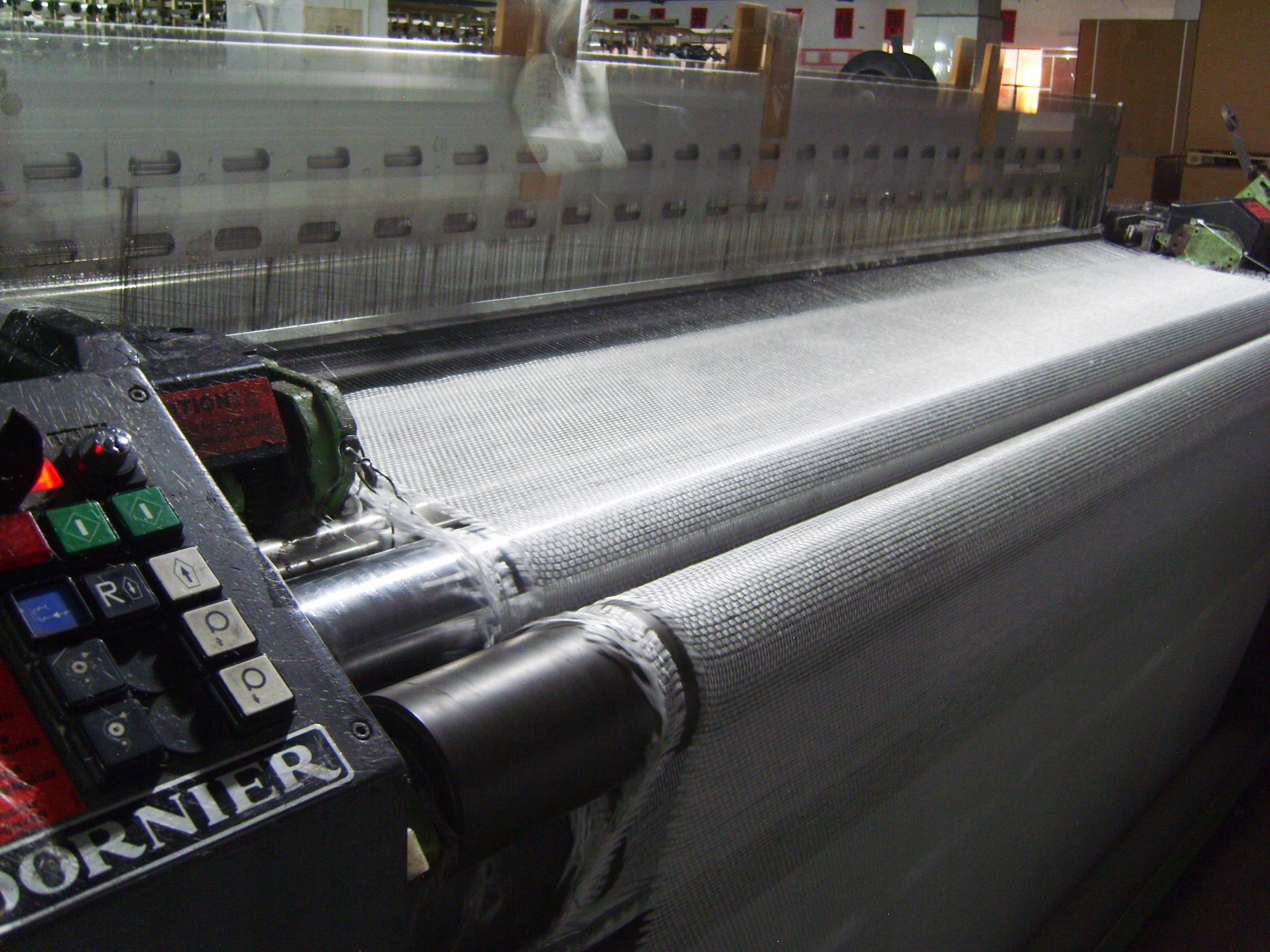
Fabric manufacturing on loom

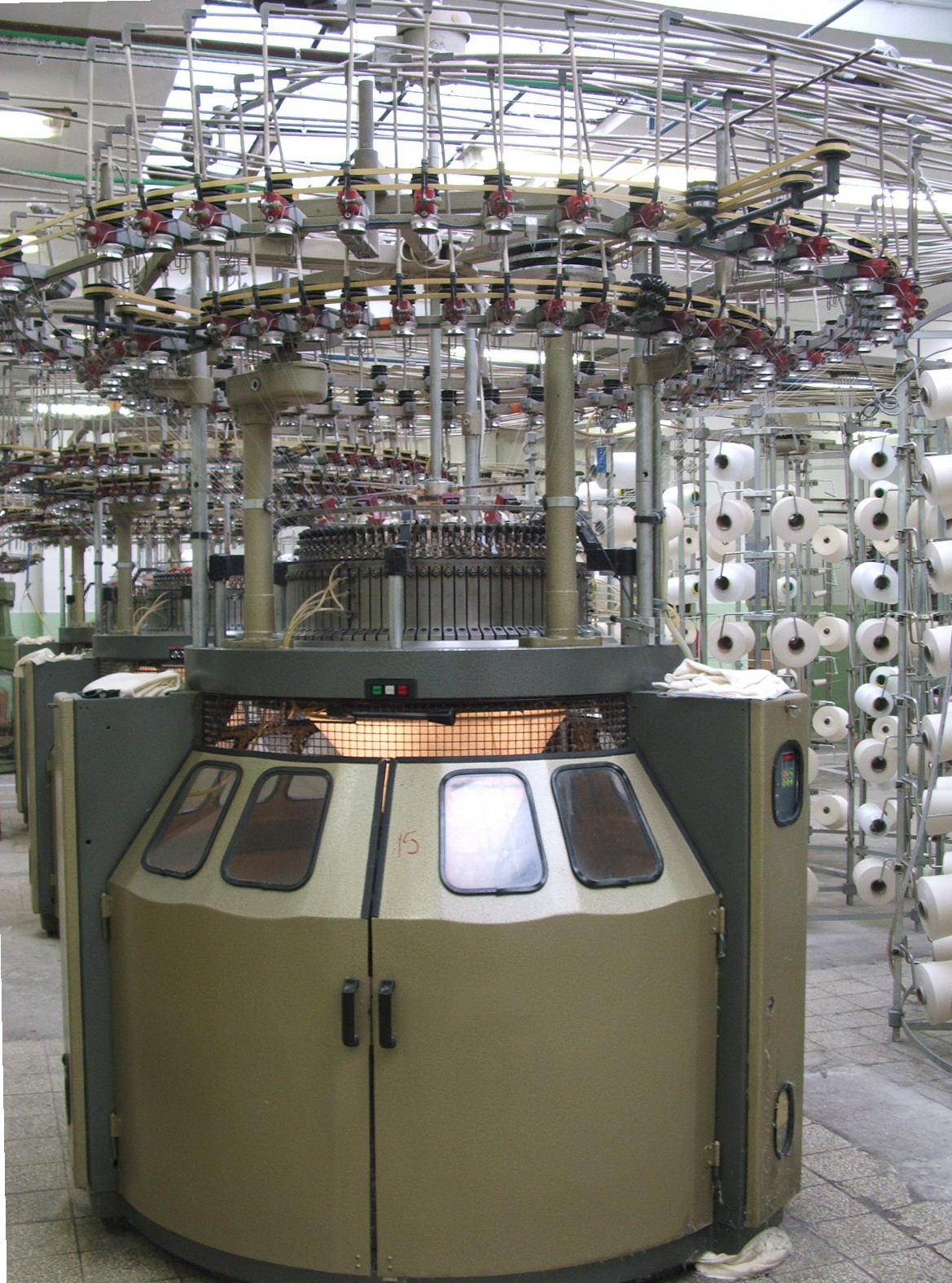
Fabric manufacturing on knitting machine

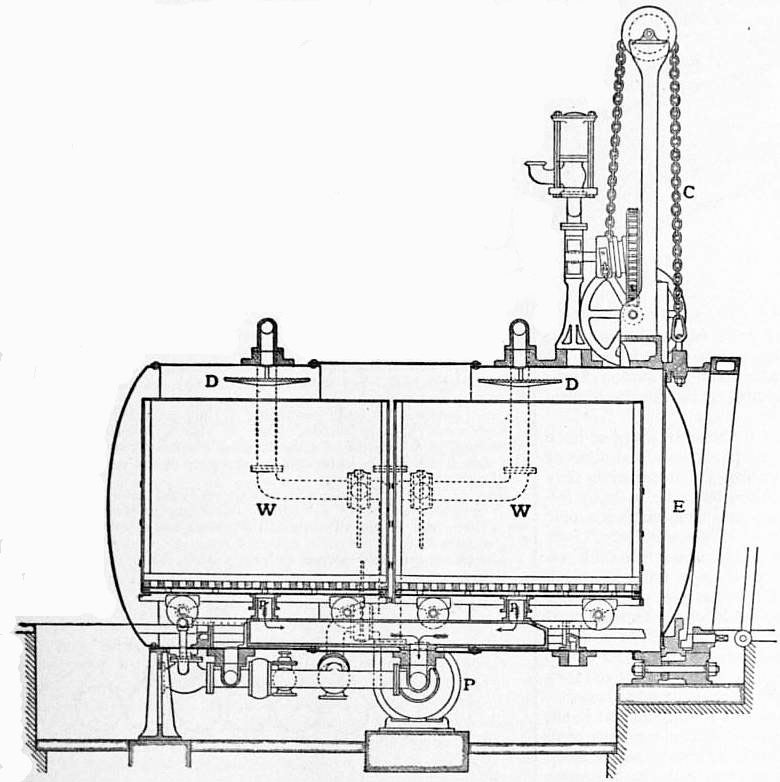
The Mather Kier, longitudinal section (Kier, an old method of scouring)

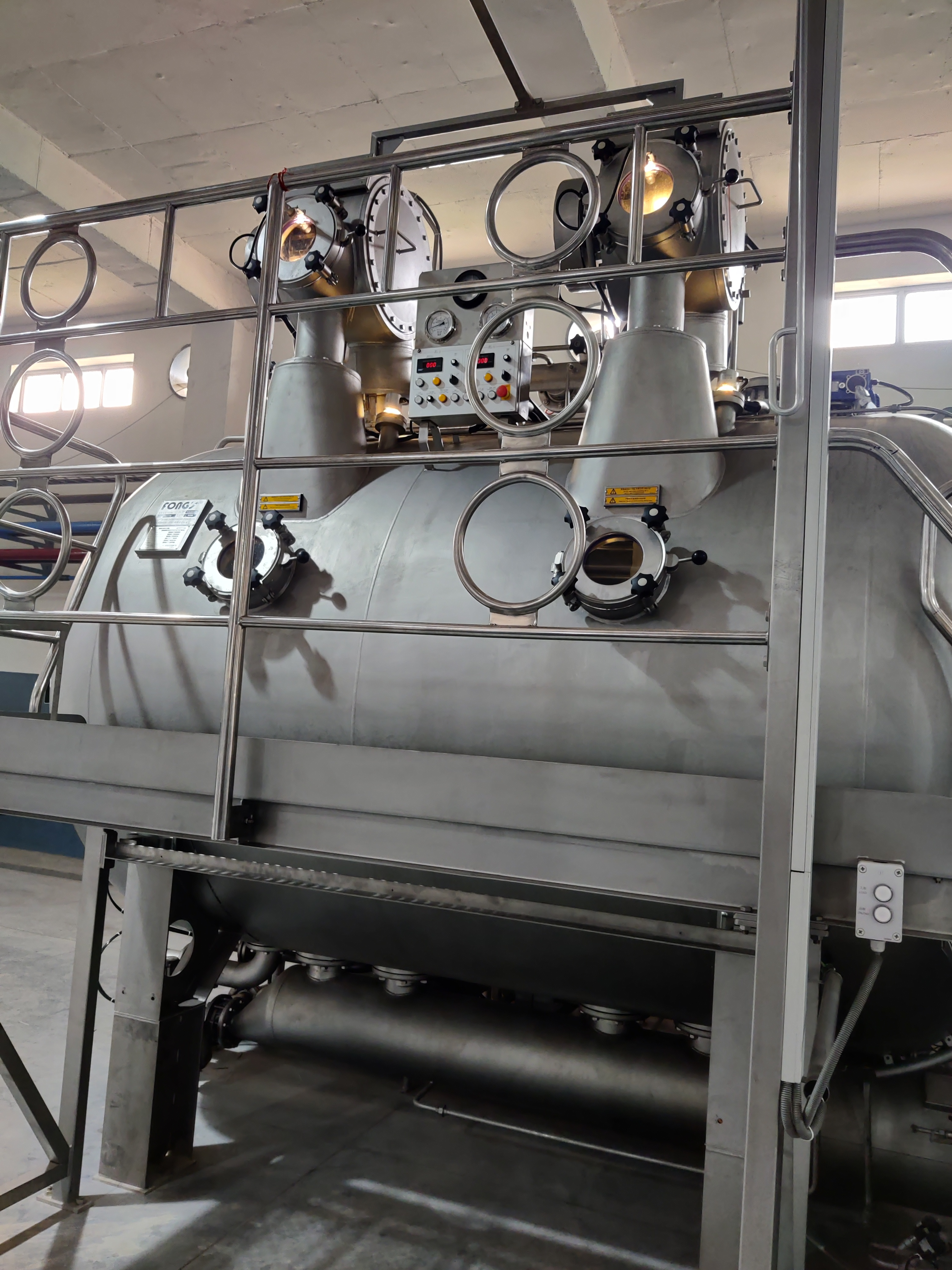
Processing pretreatment and dyeing

== Silk scouring ==
Silk is an animal fiber it consists 70–80% fibroin and 20–30% sericin (the gum coating the fibres). It carries impurities like dirt, oils, fats and sericin. The purpose of silk scouring is to remove the coloring matter and the gum that is a sticky substance which envelops the silk yarn. The process is also called ''degumming''. The gum contributes nearly 30 percent of the weight of unscoured silk threads. Silk is called ''boiled off'' when the gum is removed. The process includes the boiling the silk in a soap solution and rinsing it out.

=== Gallery ===
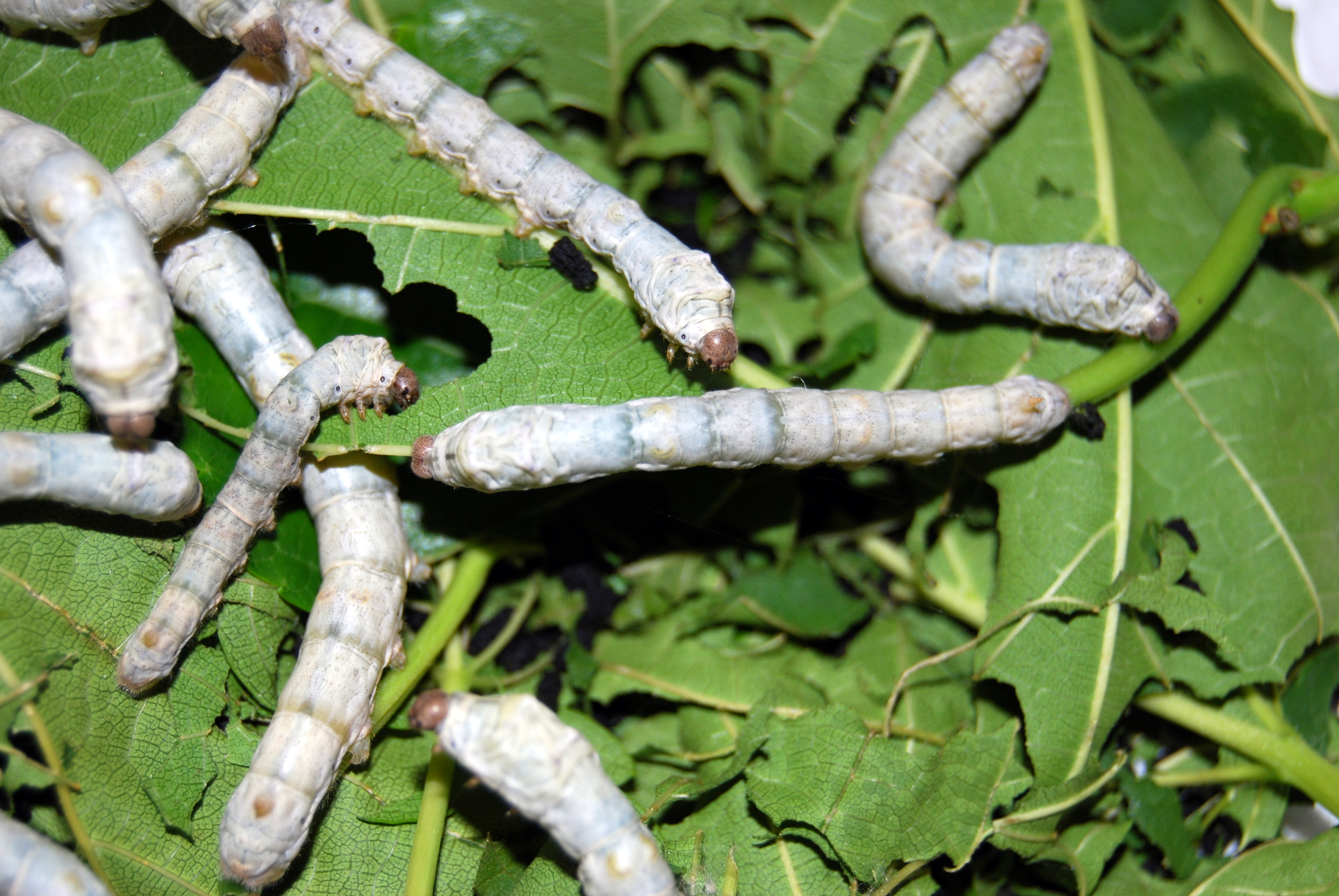
Silk worms

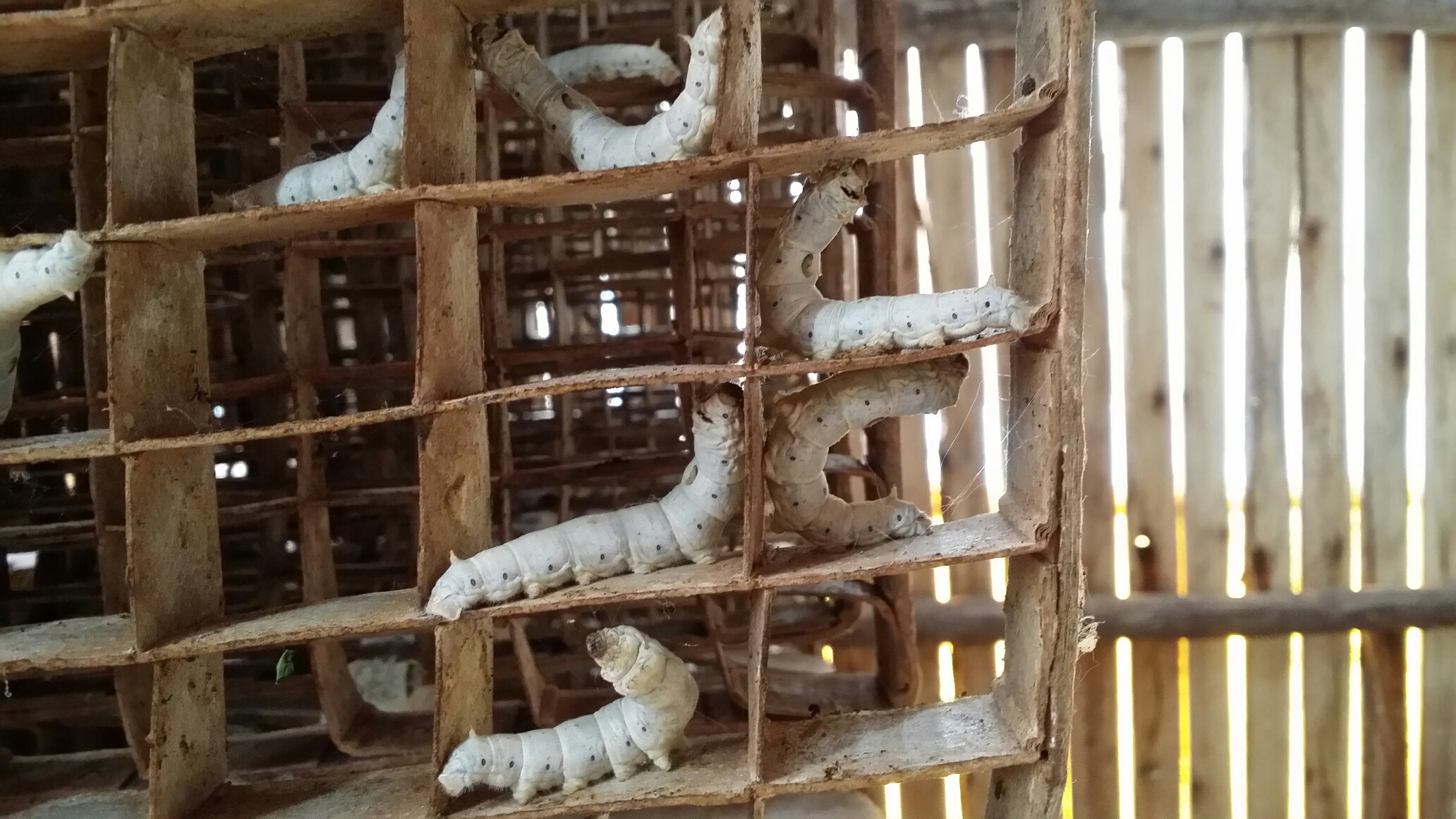
Silk worms forming cocoon

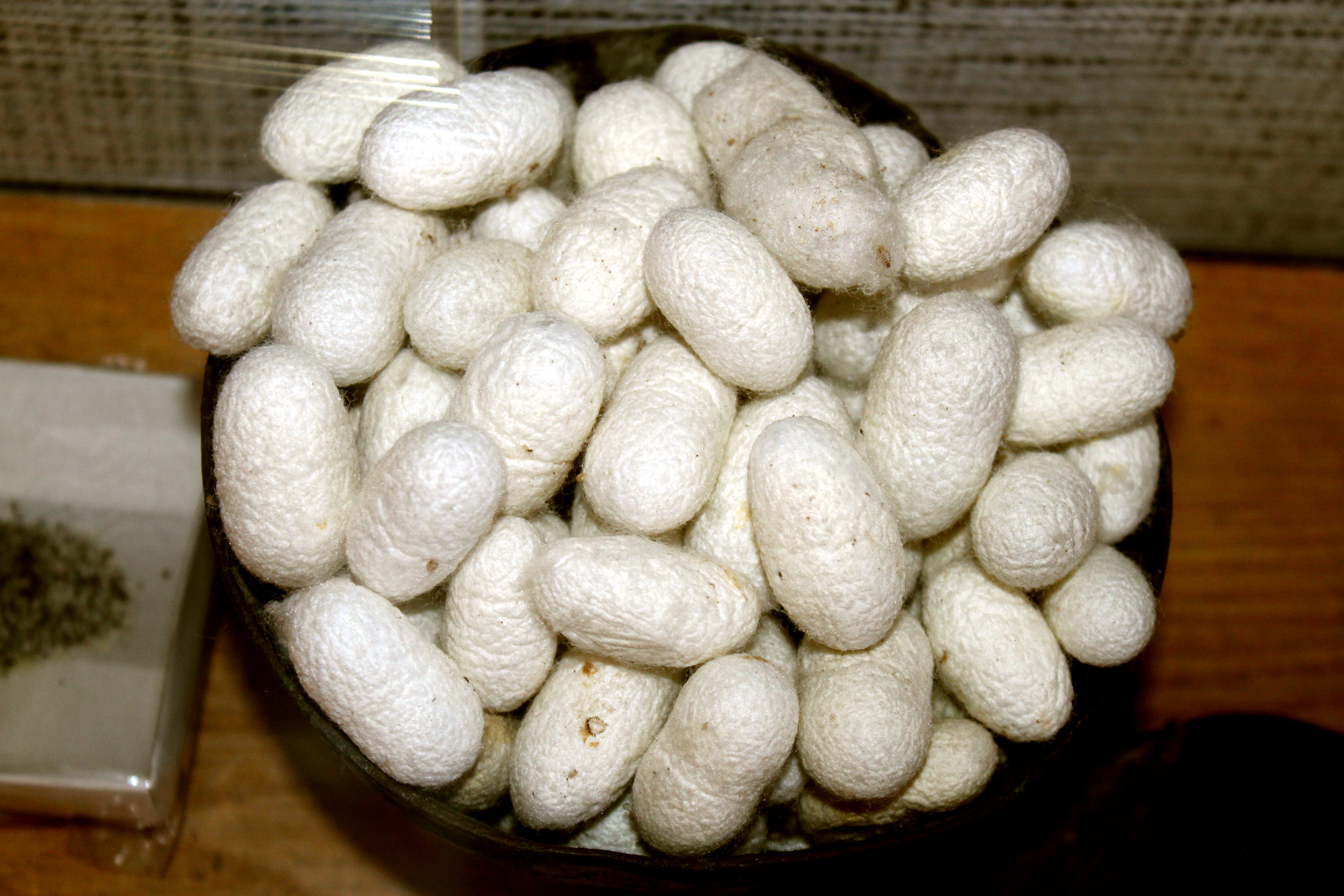
Silk cocoon

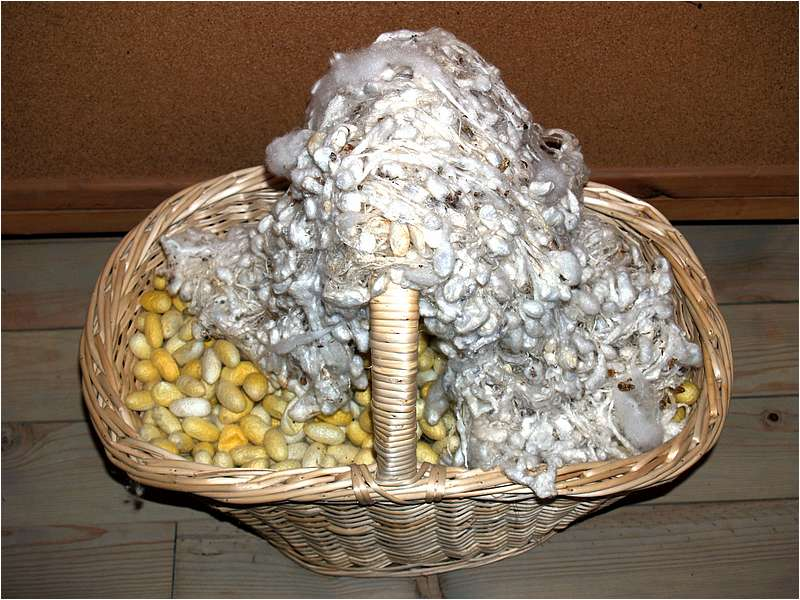
Greige silk

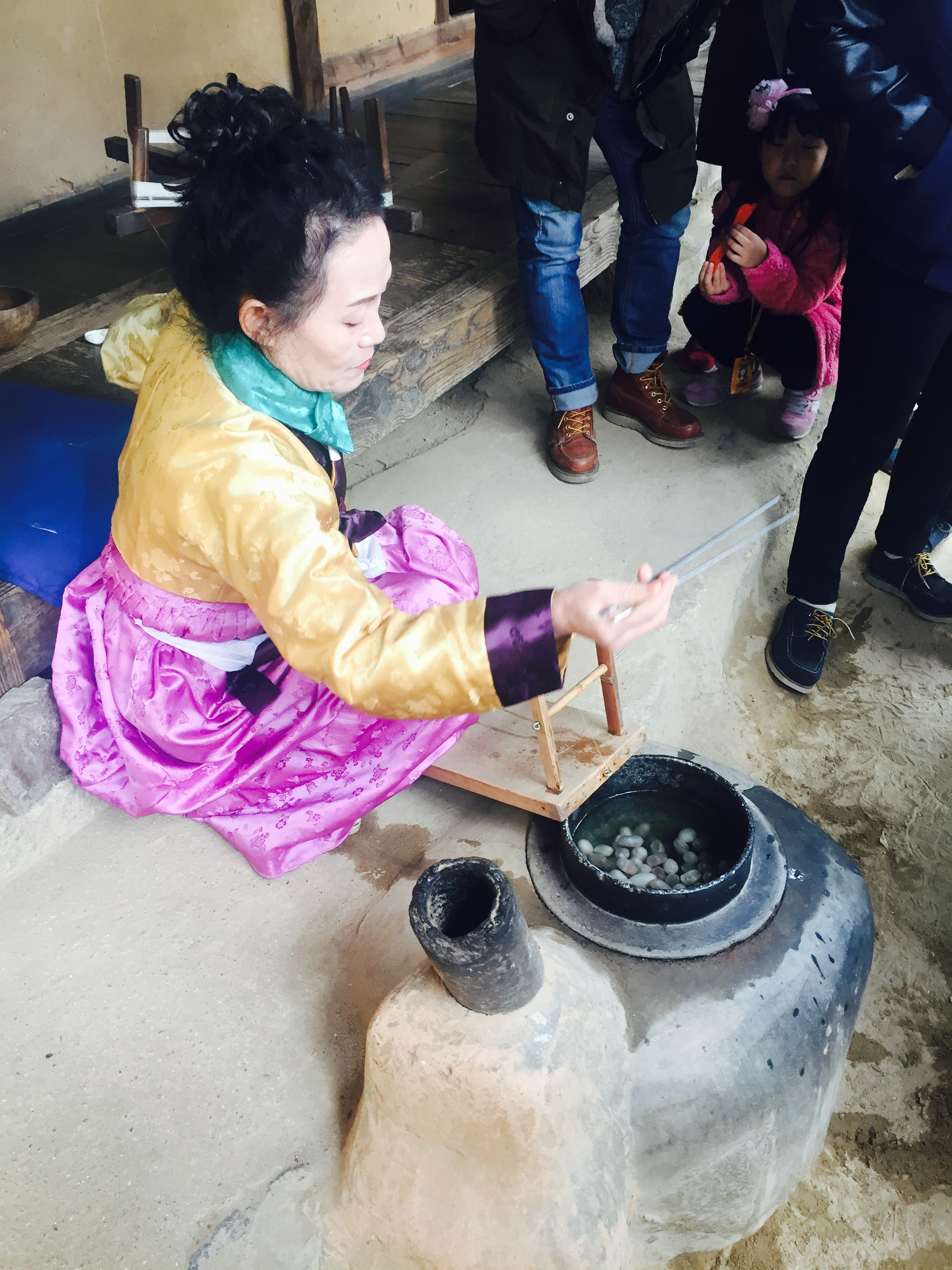
Silk extraction from cocoon

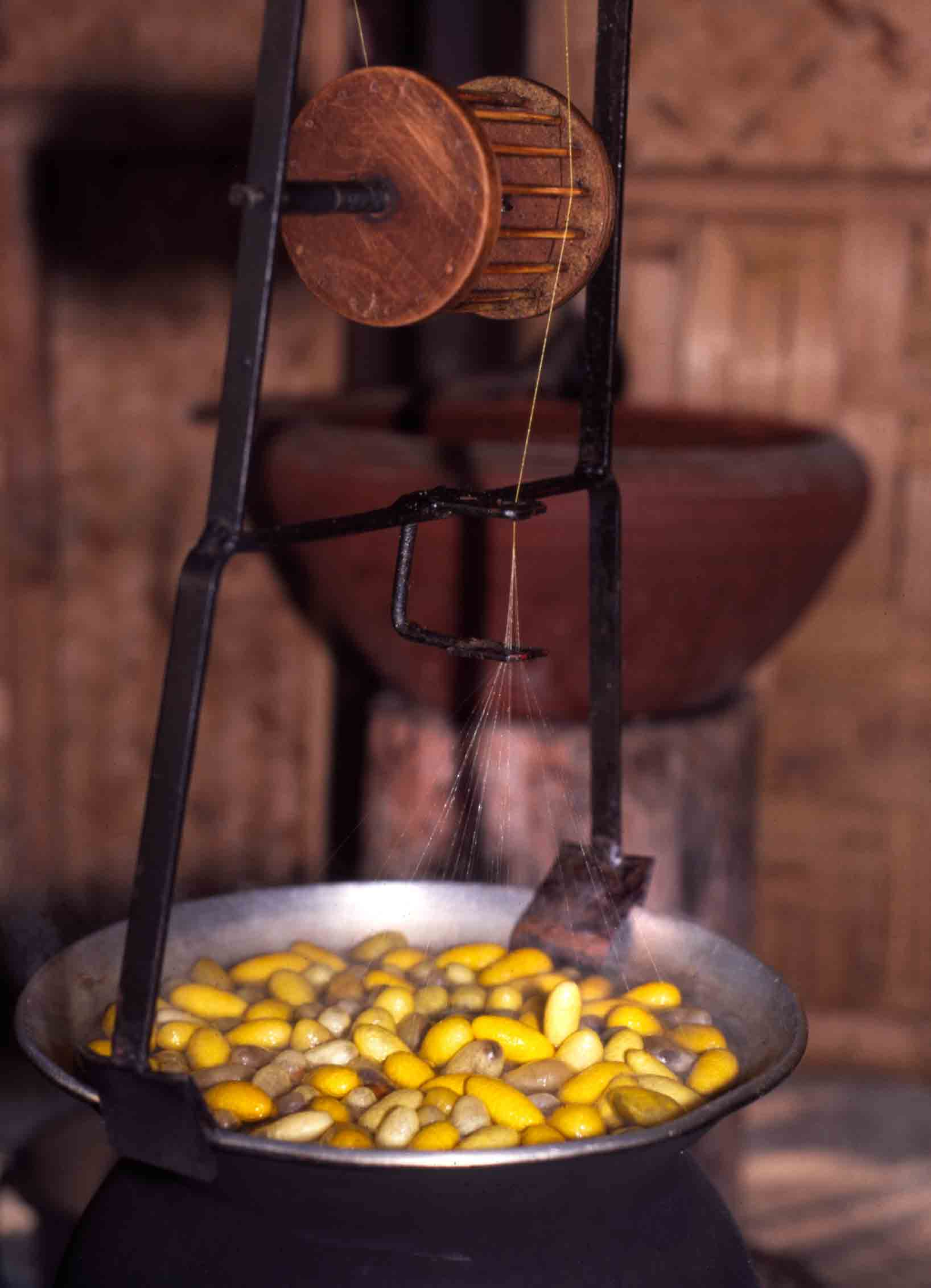
Silk cocoons boiling in water while fibres are extracted

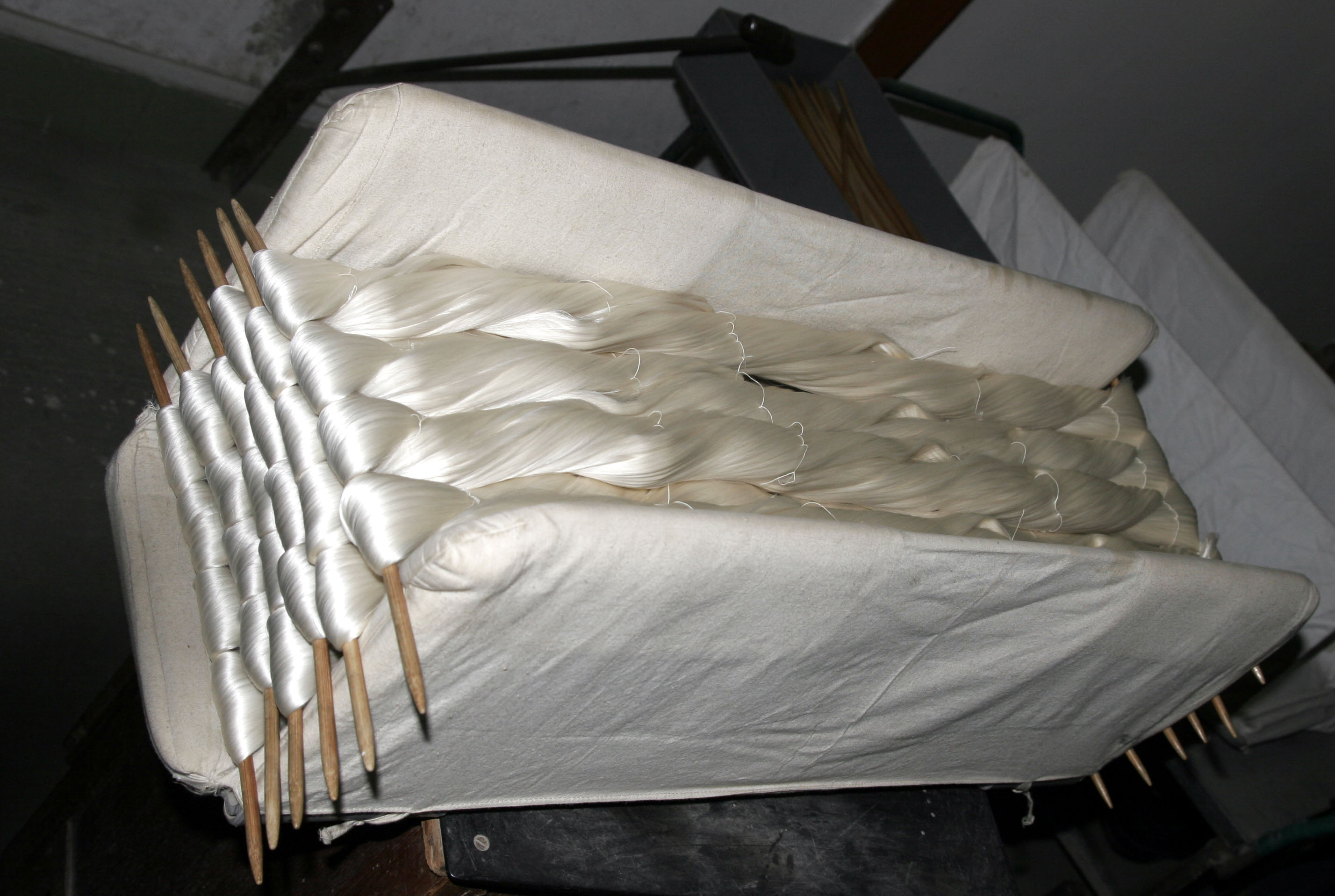
Silk hanks ready to process

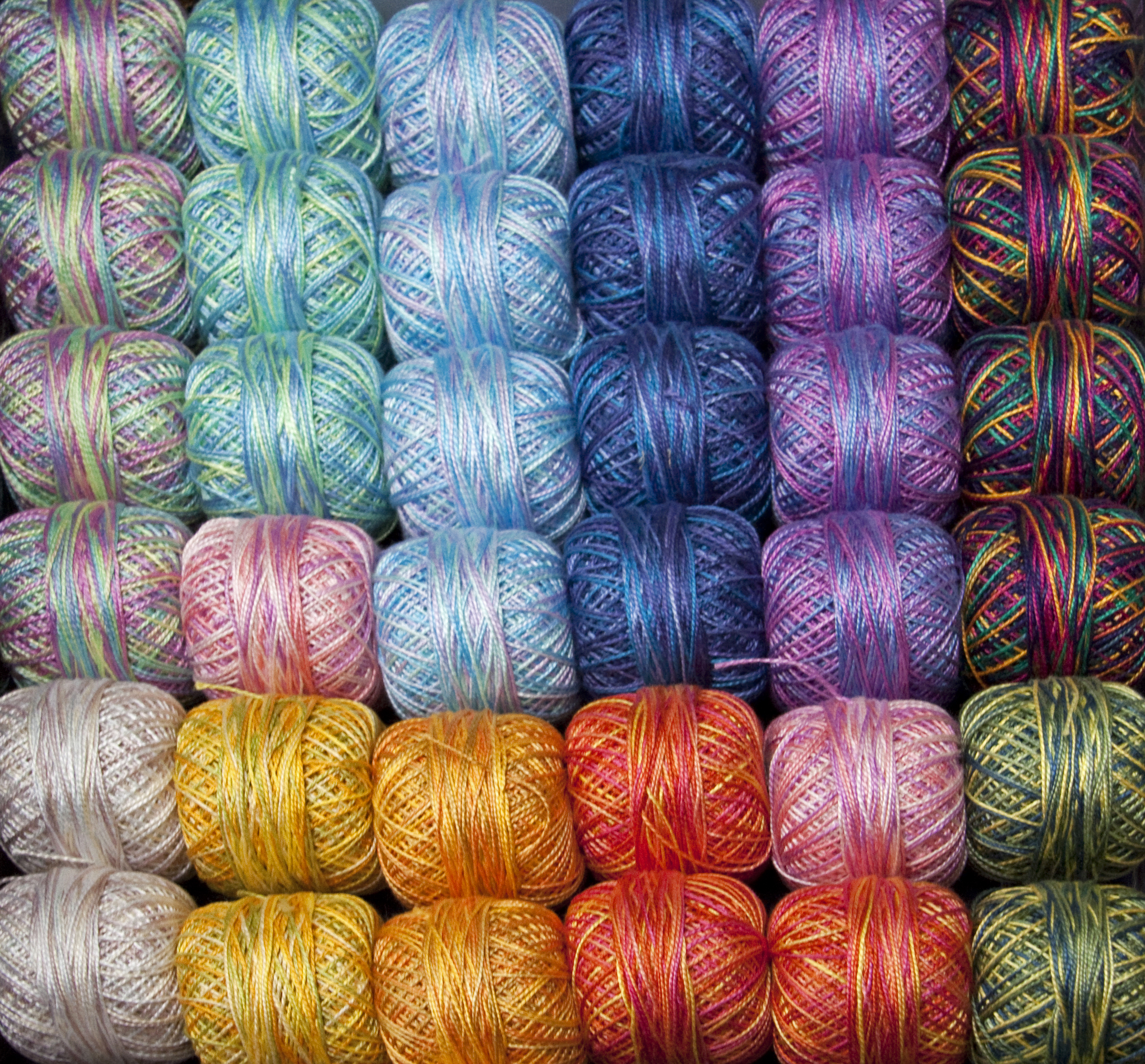
Dyed silk yarns

== Manmade material Scouring ==
Oil and dirt are the impurities in Synthetic materials. Certain oils and waxes are applied as lubricants during spinning or fabric manufacturing stages such as knitting or weaving. Mild detergents can remove the impurities effectively.

== Effluent of scouring ==
Effluent is waste water that is thrown away in the water bodies. Industrial wastewater contaminated with scouring residues is heavily contaminated and extremely polluted.

== See also ==
- Grassing (textiles)
- Singeing (textiles)
