= Silk biomaterial =

Biomaterials made from silk proteins

A silk biomaterial is a biomaterial made from the structural proteins of silk, primarily silk fibroin and, less often, the associated protein sericin. Most are obtained from the silk cocoons of the silkworm Bombyx mori, although spider silk and the silks of a few other insects are also used. The medical use of silk is far older than the term biomaterial. Silk thread served as a surgical suture for centuries before the protein was first dissolved and cast into films, gels, sponges, fibres and particles.

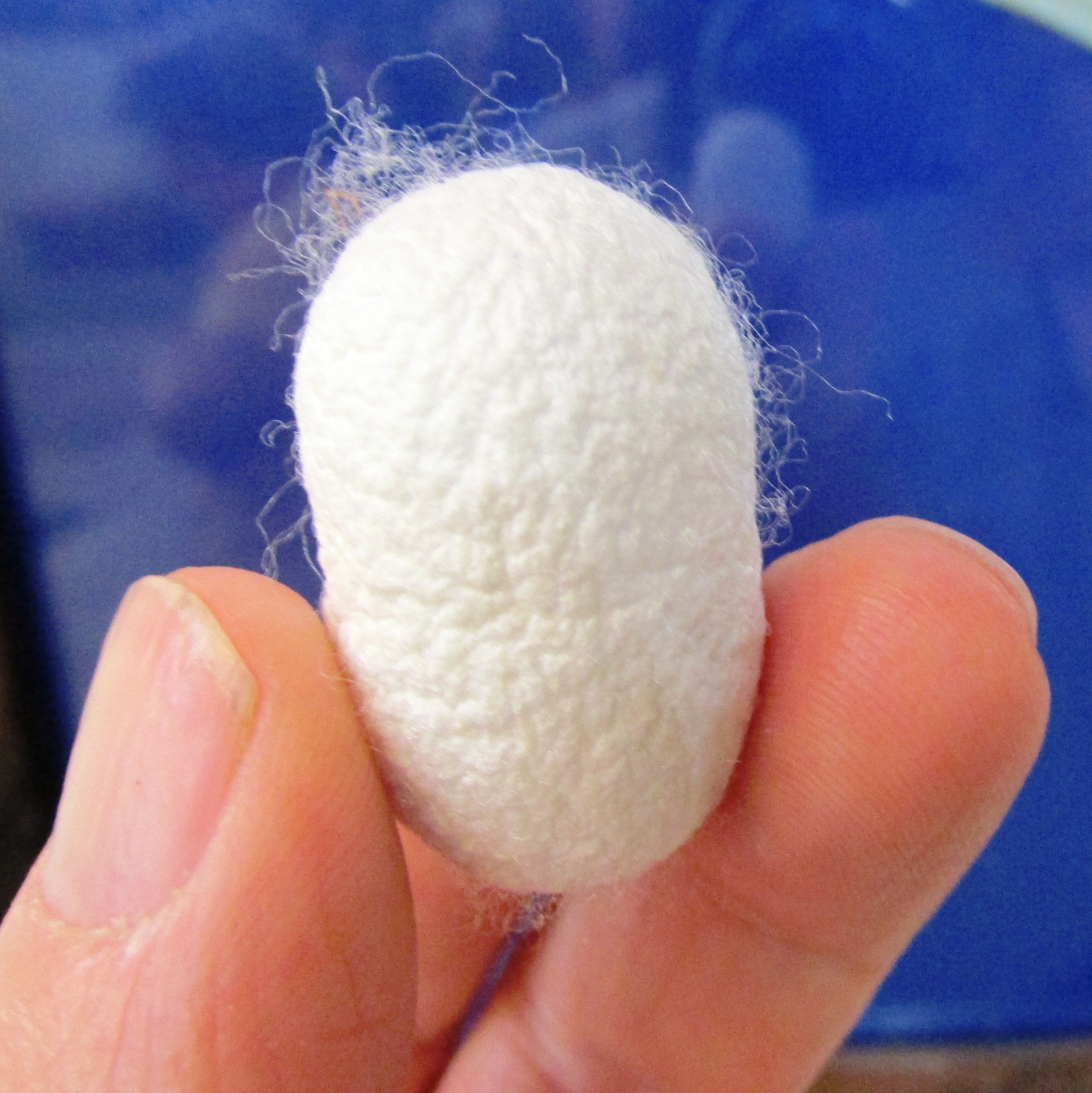
A silk cocoon held in a hand

Fibroin presents a unique combination of properties rarely found in one material. It is strong and tough, dissolves and reconstitutes in water rather than aggressive solvents, and breaks down in the body over a period that can be lengthened or shortened as required. Once the sericin is removed, it provokes only a mild immune response. A single quantity of purified protein can therefore be shaped into many different forms, each suited to a particular use.

Until the late 1990s, reliable methods for dissolving silk fibres and forming the resulting solution were not available, and most of the work after that has been based on them. Silk biomaterials are used in tissue engineering, drug delivery, wound care and bioelectronics, and a small number have reached clinical use. The factors limiting them are specific: the raw material varies from batch to batch, silk is difficult to sterilise without damaging the protein, and production is hard to scale.

== History ==
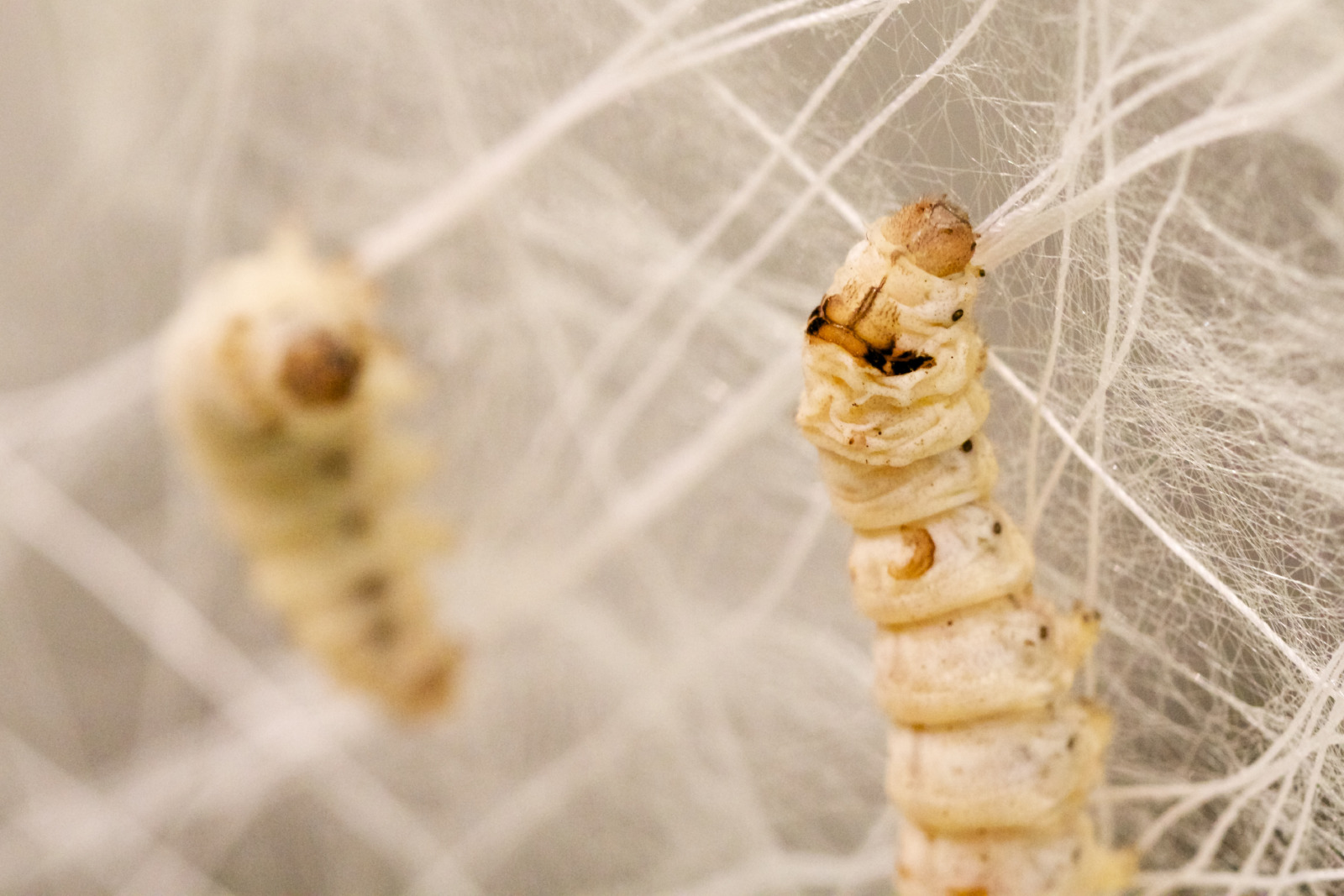
Silkworms depositing silk on a robotic scaffold, as featured in the Silk Pavilion installation

Silk has been used to close wounds for centuries. By the 19th and 20th centuries it had become one of the standard suture materials in Western surgery—strong, easy to handle and reliable at holding a knot—and braided silk remained in use long after many other natural threads had given way to synthetics.

The field in its current form began with a straightforward idea: silk could be broken down and then reassembled into a new form. Dissolving degummed fibres in a concentrated salt solution yields a water-based fibroin liquid that can be cast, spun or gelled. This regenerated silk, rather than the woven fibre, is the basis of most silk biomaterials. The methods for preparing the solution and converting it into films, sponges and hydrogels were established in the late 1990s and 2000s, much of the work carried out at Tufts University in the United States.

A 2010 review in Science described how regenerated silk had extended beyond textiles and sutures into optics, electronics and tissue engineering, and helped establish its reputation as a material that can be processed from water under mild conditions. The first engineered silk devices received regulatory clearance in the same period, marking the point at which laboratory research began to yield commercial products.

== Sources and composition ==
Silk is not a single substance but a family of fibrous proteins spun by several different animals, and the silks used as biomaterials differ both in their origin and in the proteins they contain.

=== Silk fibroin ===
Silk fibroin is the load-bearing protein of silkworm silk and the basis of most silk biomaterials. In Bombyx mori it consists of a large heavy chain of about 390 kilodaltons linked by a disulfide bond to a much smaller light chain of about 26 kilodaltons, together with a small glycoprotein. The heavy chain is dominated by long, repetitive runs of three small amino acids: glycine, alanine and serine. These sequences fold into tightly packed, ordered domains known as beta sheets, stabilised by extensive hydrogen bonding and separated by less ordered regions. This arrangement gives silk its unusual combination of stiffness and toughness.

Much of a silk material's behaviour depends on these beta-sheet domains—their abundance and their degree of alignment. Solid silk exists in two principal forms: a less stable form, sometimes designated Silk I, and the more stable, crystalline beta-sheet form, Silk II. Most processing is concerned with controlling the conversion between the two, since a higher beta-sheet content produces a material that is stronger, less soluble in water and slower to degrade.

=== Sericin ===
Sericin is a group of water-soluble proteins that coat the fibroin filaments and bind them together within the cocoon. In suture manufacture and most biomaterial processing it is removed during a step called degumming, in part because early studies associated it with inflammation and allergic reactions. That association has since been re-examined, and purified sericin is used in its own right—in coatings, gels, cosmetics and pharmaceuticals—for its capacity to retain moisture and its antioxidant activity. Recovering sericin from silk-processing wastewater also makes use of a material that would otherwise be discarded.

=== Spider and other silks ===
Spider silk, particularly the dragline silk of orb-weaving spiders, is both very strong and highly extensible, which places it among the toughest natural fibres known. The principal constraint is supply. Spiders are territorial and cannibalistic and cannot be farmed as silkworms are, so natural spider silk remains scarce. Instead, spider-silk proteins are produced by genetic engineering and expressed in bacteria, yeast or other hosts. Silks from wild silkmoths such as Antheraea species, and from other insects, have also been examined; they differ in amino acid sequence and in how they interact with cells.

== Production and processing ==
Producing a biomaterial from raw silk generally proceeds through three stages: the fibroin is purified, dissolved into a workable solution, then shaped and stabilised into a final form.

Cocoons are boiled in a mild alkaline solution, usually sodium carbonate, which removes the sericin. The degummed fibres are then dissolved, most often in concentrated lithium bromide, a salt concentrated enough to disrupt the hydrogen bonds holding the beta-sheet domains together. Dialysis against water removes the salt and leaves an aqueous fibroin solution, the common precursor for nearly everything that follows.

A single solution yields a striking variety of forms. Dried as a thin layer on a surface, it produces films and coatings used in optics, in sensors and to modify the surfaces of implants. When the protein assembles into a soft, water-swollen network—a transition driven by changes in pH or temperature, by sonication or by an applied electric field—the result is a hydrogel. Freeze-drying, or casting the protein around salt crystals or gas bubbles, produces porous sponges and scaffolds whose interconnected pores allow cells to grow in three dimensions. Drawing the solution through a high electric field spins it into fine fibres, a technique known as electrospinning, which yields non-woven mats resembling the natural network surrounding cells. The same solution can also be formed into microspheres and nanoparticles for carrying and releasing drugs.

Many of these forms are initially water-soluble, which is a disadvantage where the material must retain its shape within the body. Stability is achieved by increasing the beta-sheet content, through treatment with methanol or ethanol, exposure to water vapour, mechanical stretching, or controlled heating. Because the same ordered structure governs both strength and the rate of degradation, this step also serves as the principal means of tuning a material's properties.

== Properties ==
Native silk fibre is both strong and tough, and silkworm silk spun under controlled conditions approaches spider dragline silk in strength. Regenerated silk rarely matches it, because reprocessing disrupts the ordered molecular alignment produced during natural spinning, and the reconstituted material is correspondingly weaker. The extent of this loss depends on the format and the beta-sheet content, and matching the properties of native silk in regenerated form has not yet been fully resolved.

Purified fibroin is well tolerated by living tissue and supports the attachment and growth of many cell types. The mild reaction associated with modern silk biomaterials results largely from purification: when sericin and other residues are removed the response is slight, whereas their presence provokes a stronger reaction. This is a large part of why degumming is emphasised in device manufacture.

Many synthetic implants remain essentially inert in the body; silk does not. Protease enzymes such as chymotrypsin cleave it into peptides and amino acids that the body can absorb. The rate of degradation is not fixed; it can be set from a few weeks to more than a year by adjusting the beta-sheet content, the format and the porosity. This allows a scaffold to be designed so that it degrades at approximately the rate at which new tissue forms. Surgical silk is sometimes described as non-degradable, a term that reflects the slow loss of strength of a thick braided suture rather than any permanence of the protein itself.

== Biomedical applications ==
The oldest application is also the simplest: the surgical suture. Braided silk is easy to handle and holds a knot securely, and it remains in clinical use, although it can provoke a tissue reaction and lose strength over time, and synthetic threads have replaced it in some procedures.

Porous silk scaffolds serve as temporary frameworks for regrowing tissue. Because their strength can be set and their degradation slowed, they suit tissues that either bear load or heal slowly—bone, cartilage, skin, and connective tissues such as ligament and tendon, where the toughness of silk is an advantage. Cells are seeded onto the scaffold, which provides mechanical support while they become established and is gradually replaced by the body's own tissue.

Silk films, gels and particles can hold a drug and release it slowly. The mild, water-based processing is the principal advantage: sensitive drugs and proteins survive incorporation, and release can be slowed by increasing the beta-sheet content of the surrounding silk. Silk coatings have also been used to stabilise vaccines and other biologics against heat.

Thin silk films are transparent, can be moulded with fine surface patterns and dissolve in the body, a combination well suited to biodegradable electronics and optics. Silicon components have been fabricated on silk films designed to conform to tissue and then dissolve once their function is complete, an approach known as transient or bioresorbable electronics. Silk has also been formed into lenses, diffraction gratings and sensors.

== Commercial and clinical products ==
The clearest commercial example is the SERI Surgical Scaffold, a knitted mesh of highly purified silk fibroin that originated in research at Tufts University and was first marketed by Serica Technologies. The U.S. Food and Drug Administration cleared it in 2009 as a temporary scaffold for the support and reinforcement of soft tissue; the product was subsequently held by Allergan and then by Sofregen Medical. After implantation the mesh provides immediate mechanical support and is gradually resorbed and replaced by the patient's own collagen. Silk sutures remain in widespread clinical use, and other silk-based products and devices are in development or early clinical testing.

=== Challenges ===
Despite its promise, relatively little silk has reached the clinic, and the reasons are specific. Foremost among them is variability. Silk is a farmed natural product, so its composition shifts with the silkworm strain, its diet and its rearing conditions, and this batch-to-batch variation is difficult to reconcile with the strict specifications required of a medical device. Processing introduces further variation: the duration of exposure to the dissolving salt and the amount of heat applied both affect the molecular weight of the regenerated protein, and with it the strength and degradation of the final product.

Sterilisation presents a further difficulty, since standard autoclaving alters the structure of the protein, and a gentler method must be identified and validated for each format. Controlling the degradation rate precisely, scaling laboratory processes to industrial volumes, and meeting the regulatory requirements for an implanted device are each demanding in their own right. These engineering and manufacturing obstacles, rather than any deficiency in the biological performance of silk, are the main reason that most of it remains in the laboratory.

=== Environmental aspects ===
Silk is often held up as a prime example of green chemistry in materials science, and the argument is not without merit. Fibroin can be purified and processed largely in water, avoiding the organic solvents and high temperatures typically required for synthetic polymers, and the protein itself is renewable and biodegradable. The recovery of both fibroin and sericin from silk and textile industries turns waste and by-products into feedstock. Benefits like these have to be weighed against the resource needs of silk farming and the energy involved in degumming and purification.

== See also ==
- Biodegradable polymer
