= Grassing (disambiguation) =

Grassing may refer to

- Grassing, an Informant, a person who provides privileged information about a person or organization to an agency.
- Grassing (textiles), an old method of bleaching.
