= Grassing (textiles) =

Old method of bleaching

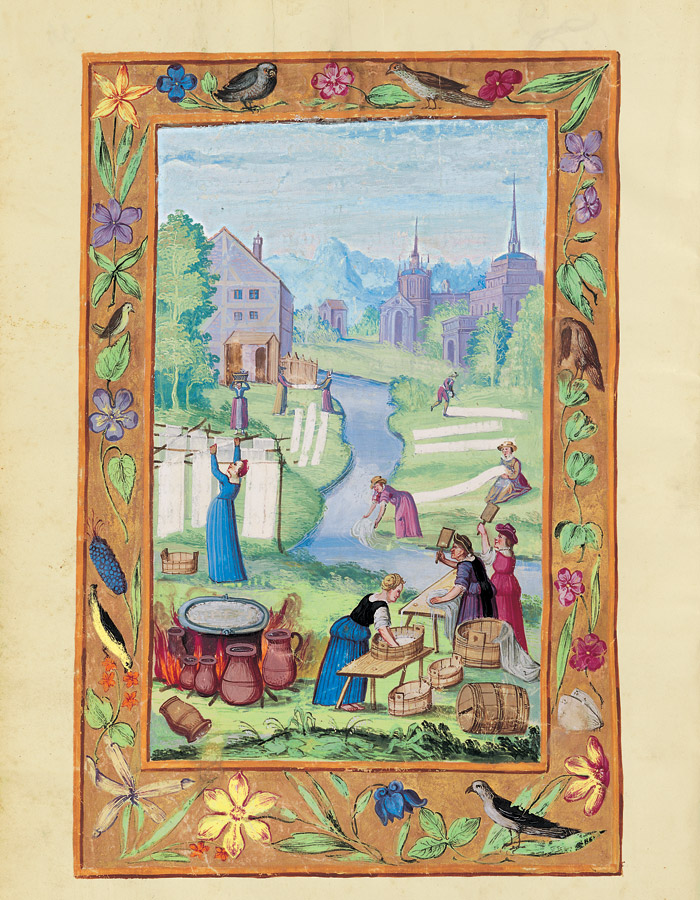
Grassing, laying out linens to bleach in sunlight

Grassing is one of the oldest methods of bleaching textile goods. The grassing method has long been used in Europe to bleach linen and cotton based fabrics.

== Method ==
The linens were laid out on the grass for over seven days after boiling with the ''lyes of ashes and rinsing''. The atmospheric oxygen and the oxygen left by the grass provide the whitening action. The cloth becomes whiter day by day until it attains the full whiteness. It was a slow process, but safer for the subjected material. Chemical bleaching may harm the cloth, but grassing hardly affects the cloth's strength.

== Bleachfield ==
The Bleachfield was an open area to spread cloth. It was a field near the watercourse used by a bleachery. Bleachfields were common in and around the mill towns during the British Industrial Revolution

== Chemical bleaching ==
With the discovery of Chlorine in the late 18th century, chemical bleaching took over from grassing, as it was quicker and could be done indoors.

== Gallery ==
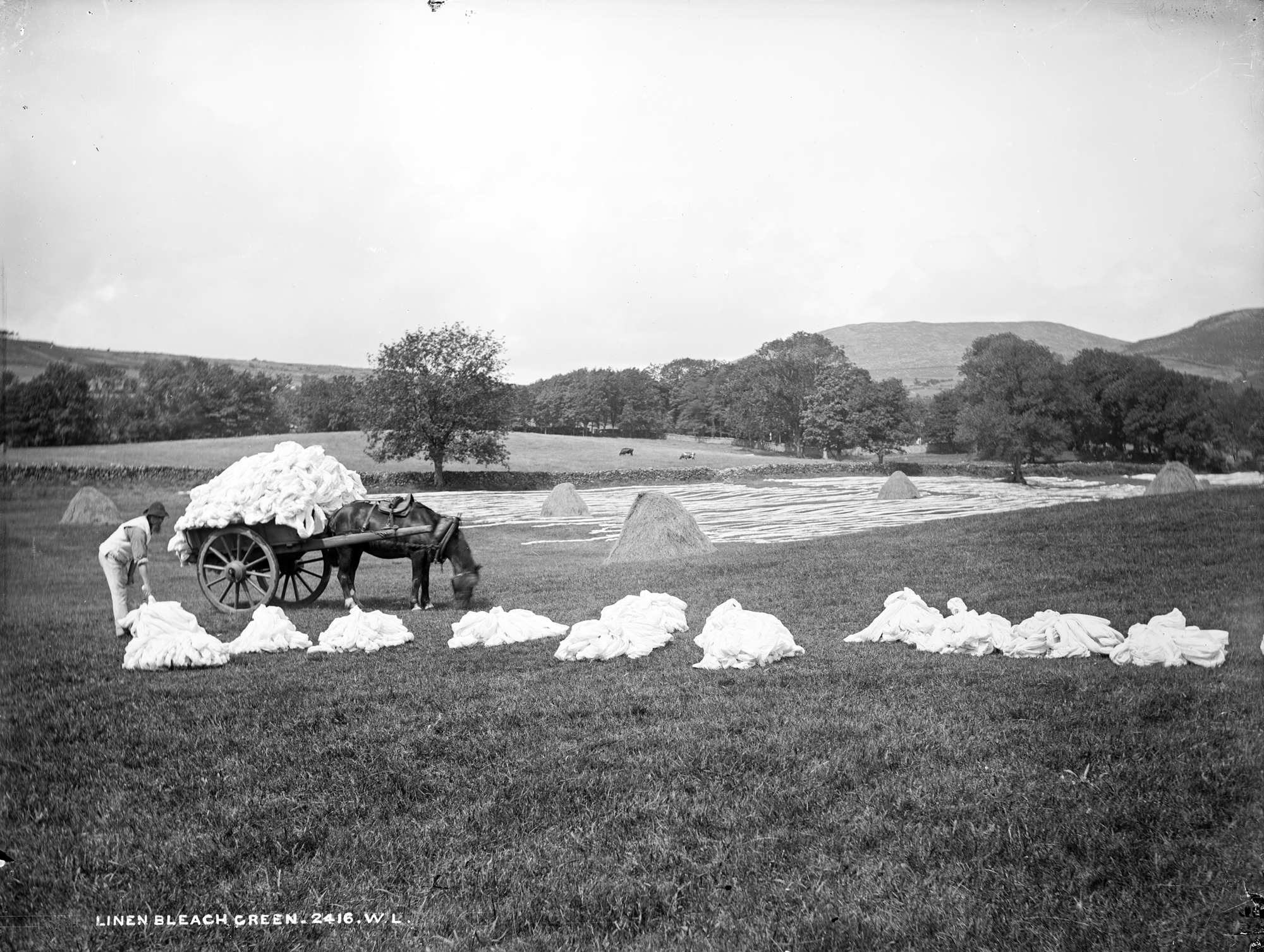
Linen Bleaching/ Grassing

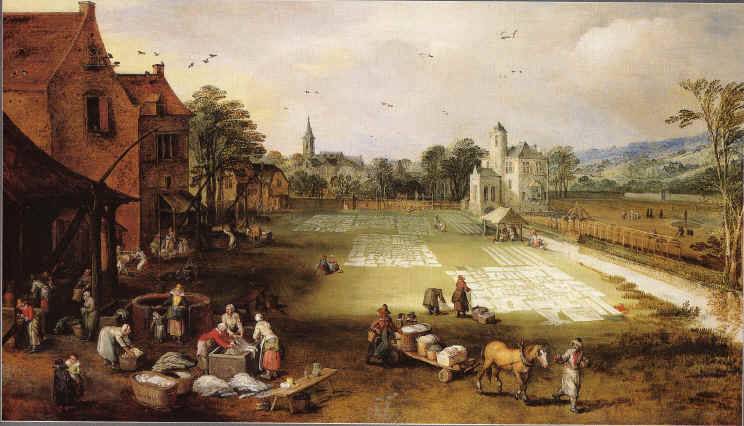
Bleaching Ground

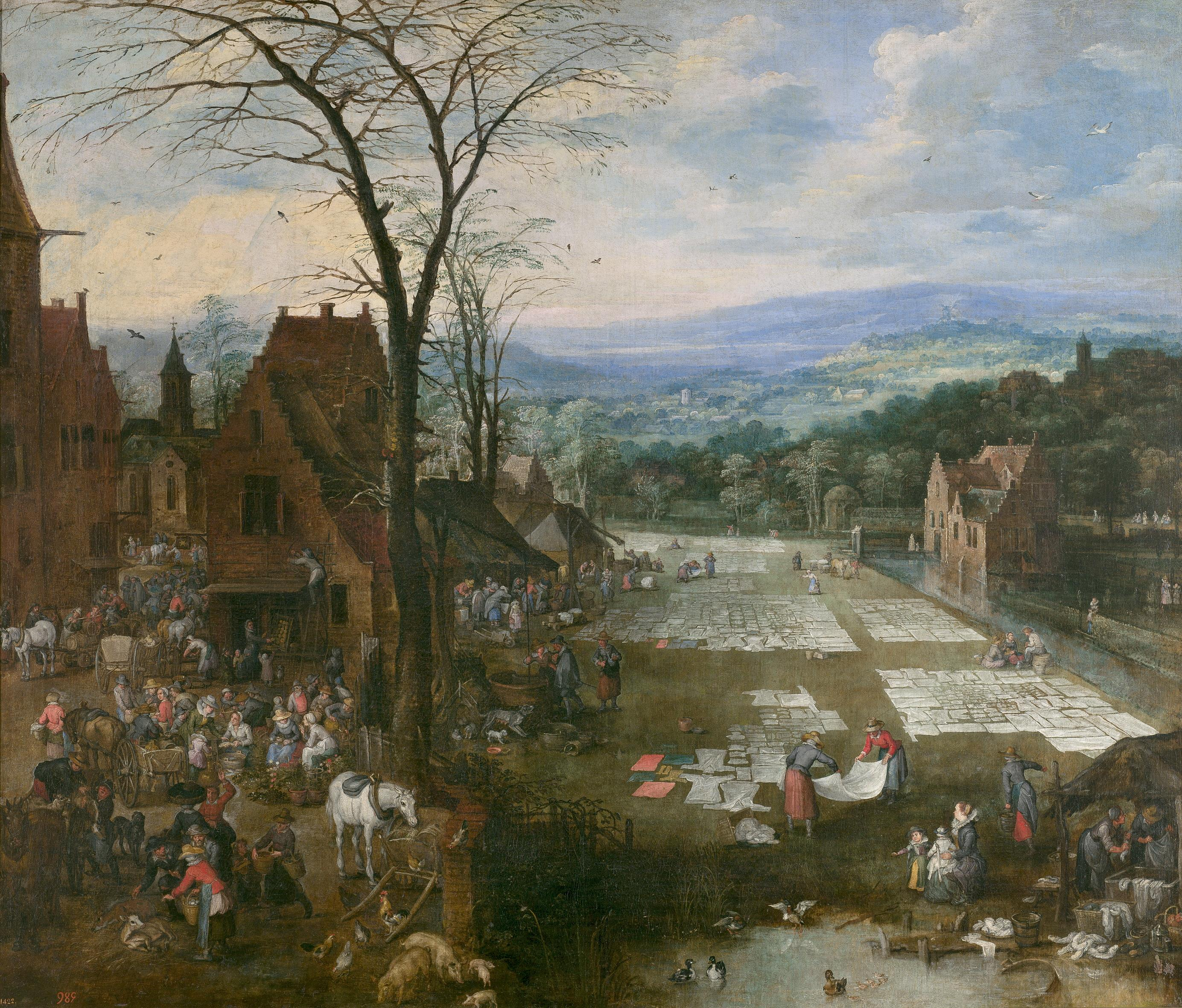
Market and washing place in Flanders

== See also ==
- Timeline of clothing and textiles technology
- Scouring (textiles)
