= Sericin =

Protein produced by silkworms

Sericin 1

Identifiers
- Organism: Bombyx mori
- Symbol: ser1
- Orthologs: OMA: entry
- UniProt: P07856
Search for
- Structures: Swiss-model
- Domains: InterPro

Sericin 2

Identifiers
- Organism: Bombyx mori
- Symbol: ser2
- Orthologs: OMA: entry
- UniProt: D2WL77
Search for
- Structures: Swiss-model
- Domains: InterPro

Sericin 3

Identifiers
- Organism: Bombyx mori
- Symbol: ser3
- Orthologs: OMA: entry
- UniProt: A8CEQ1
Search for
- Structures: Swiss-model
- Domains: InterPro

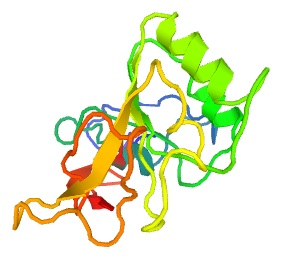
Diagram of Sercina

Sericin is a protein created by Bombyx mori (silkworms) in the production of silk. Silk is a fibre produced by the silkworm in the production of its cocoon. It consists mainly of two proteins, fibroin and sericin. Silk consists of 70–80% fibroin and 20–30% sericin; fibroin being the structural center of the silk, and sericin being the gum coating the fibres and allowing them to stick to each other.

== Structure ==
Sericin is composed of 18 different amino acids, of which 32% is serine. The secondary structure is usually a random coil, but it can also be easily converted into a β-sheet conformation, via repeated moisture absorption and mechanical stretching. The serine hydrogen bonds give its glue-like quality. The genes encoding sericin proteins have been sequenced. Its C-terminal part contains many serine-rich repeats.

Using gamma ray examination, it was determined that sericin fibers are composed typically of three layers, all with fibers running in different patterns of directionality. The innermost layer, typically is composed of longitudinally running fibers, the middle layer is composed of cross fiber directional patterned fibers, and the outer layer consists of fiber directional fibers. The overall structure can also vary based on temperature, whereas the lower the temperature, there were typically more β-sheet conformations than random amorphous coils. There are also three different types of sericin, which make up the layers found on top of the fibroin. Sericin A, which is insoluble in water, is the outermost layer, and contains approximately 17% nitrogen, along with amino acids such as serine, threonine, aspartic acid, and glycine. Sericin B, composed the middle layer and is nearly the same as sericin A, but also contains tryptophan. Sericin C is the innermost layer, the layer that comes closest to and is adjacent to fibroin. Also insoluble in water, sericin C can be separated from the fibroin via the addition of a hot, weak acid. Sericin C also contains the amino acids present in B, along with the addition of proline.

== Applications ==
Sericin has also been used in medicine and cosmetics. Due to its elasticity and tensile strength, along with a natural affinity for keratin, sericin is primarily used in medicine for wound suturing. It also has a natural infection resistance, and is used variably due to excellent biocompatibility, and thus is used commonly as a wound coagulant as well. When used in cosmetics, sericin has been found to improve skin elasticity and several anti-aging factors, including an anti-wrinkle property. This is done by minimizing water loss from the skin. To determine this, scientists ran several experimental procedures, including a hydroxyproline assay, impedance measurements, water loss from the epidermis and scanning electron microscopy to analyze the rigidity and dryness of the skin. The presence of sericin increases hydroxyproline in the stratum corneum, which in turn, decreases skin impedance, thus increasing skin moisture. Adding in pluronic and carbopol, two other ingredients that can be included in sericin gels, performs the action of repairing natural moisture factors (NMF), along with minimizing water loss and in turn, improving skin moisture.

== See also ==
- Silk amino acid
