= List of mines in Pakistan =

This list of mines in Pakistan is subsidiary to the list of mines article and lists working, defunct and future mines in the country and is organised by the primary mineral output. For practical purposes stone, marble and other quarries may be included in this list.

== Coal ==
- Chamalang Coal Mines
- Indus East coal mine
- Jherruck coal mine
- Jhimpir coal mine
- Lakhra coal mine
- Ongar coal mine
- Saleh Jo Tar coal mine
- Salt Range coal mine
- Singharo Bhitro coal mine
- Sinhar Vikian Varvai coal mine
- Sonalba coal mine
- Sonda-Thatta coal mine

== Copper ==
- Reko Diq Mine
- Saindak Copper Gold Project

== Gemstone ==
- Chumar Bakhoor

== Gold ==
- Reko Diq Mine
- Saindak Copper Gold Project

== Gypsum ==
- Dadukhel mine
- Dera Ismail Khan mine
- Khewra mine
- Kohat mine
- Mawand mine
- Rakhi-Munh mine

== Lead ==
- Duddar mine

== Magnesium ==
- Kumhar mine

== Salt ==
Mine	Product(s)	Coordinates	Associated town	Owner	Dates	Comments
Khewra Salt Mines	Salt		Khewra	Pakistan Mineral Development Corporation (PMDC)	????-Present	It is said that when Alexander visited South Asia, coming across the Jhelum and Mianwali region, Khewra Salt Mines were discovered. The discovery of the mines, however, was not made by Alexander nor his "allies", but by his horse. It is stated that when Alexander's army stopped here for rest, the horses started licking the stones. One of his soldiers took notice of it and when he tasted the rock stone, it was salty thus leading to the discovery of the mines.
Bahadurkhel mine	Salt		Bahadur Khel			
Ghani Salt Mine	Salt		Warcha	Ghani Mines Pvt Ltd	1963–present	
Warcha salt mine	Salt		Warcha	Pakistan Mineral Development Corporation (PMDC)	1872–present	

== Sodium Chloride ==
- Bahadurkhel mine
- Kalabagh mines
- Khewra mines

== Zinc ==
- Duddar mine
