= Kostas Skrekas =

Greek politician (born 1973)

- Κώστας Σκρέκας
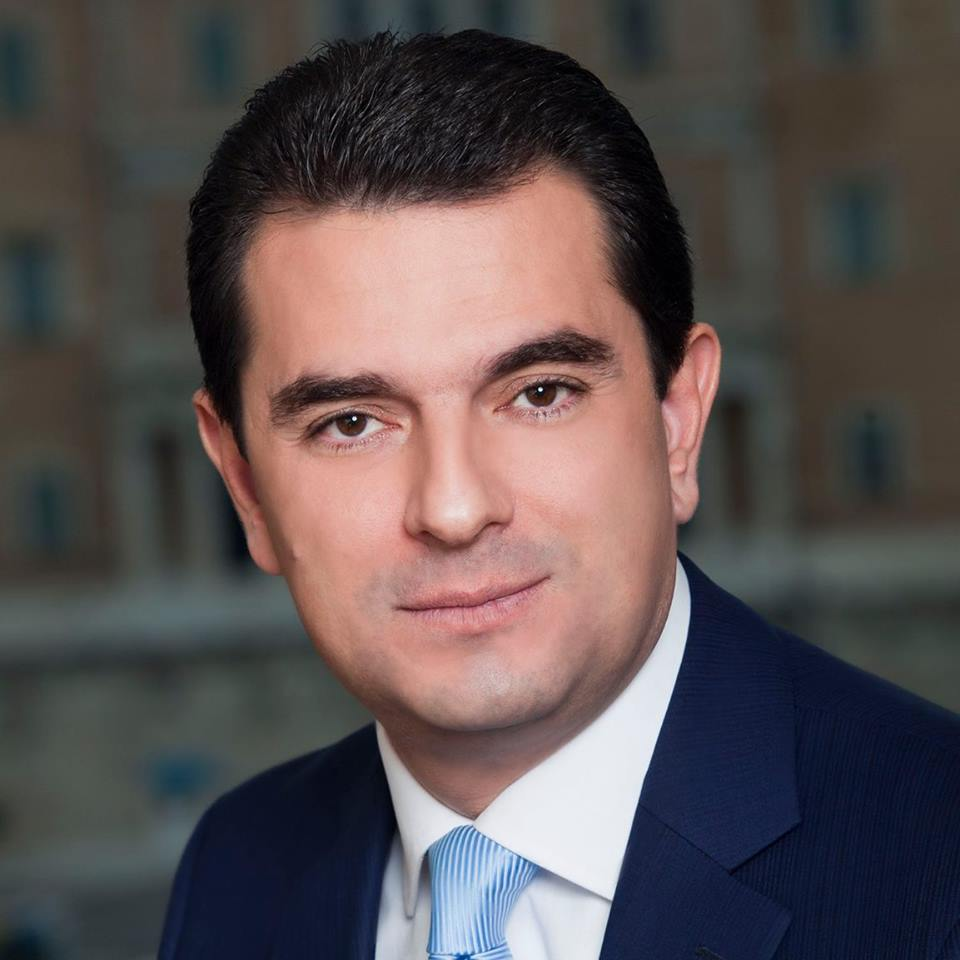

Minister of the Environment and Energy
- In office 5 January 2021 – 26 May 2023
- Prime Minister: Kyriakos Mitsotakis
- Preceded by: Kostis Hatzidakis
- Succeeded by: Pantelis Kapros

Minister of Development
- In office 27 June 2023 – 14 June 2024
- Prime Minister: Kyriakos Mitsotakis
- Preceded by: Helen Loures
- Succeeded by: Takis Theodorikakos

Personal details
- Born: 14 March 1973 (age 53)
- Party: New Democracy
- Education: University of Birmingham
- Website: skrekaskostas.gr

Kostas Skrekas (Greek: Κώστας Σκρέκας, born 14 March 1973) is a Greek civil engineer and politician of the New Democracy party who served as Minister of the Environment and Energy in the cabinet of Prime Minister Kyriakos Mitsotakis from 2021 to 2023.

== Political career ==
In the May 2012 elections, Skrekas was first elected a member of the parliament, representing Trikala, making him one of the youngest MPs at the time.

From November 2014 to January 2015, Skrekas briefly served as Minister of Development and Competitiveness in the cabinet of Prime Minister Antonis Samaras.

Following the 2019 Greek legislative election, Skrekas became deputy of Minister of Rural Development and Food Makis Voridis, in charge of Common Agricultural Policy in the Mitsotakis government. After a reshuffle on 4 January 2021, he became the new Minister of Environment and Energy. In this capacity, he signed a revised $3.1 billion contract with Canada’s Eldorado Gold in February 2021, covering the company's Skouries, Olympias and Stratoni / Mavres Petres mines and facilities in northern Greece.

Political offices
Preceded by Kostis Hatzidakis	Minister of the Environment and Energy; 2021–2023	Succeeded by Pantelis Kapros
