= Mining in Pakistan =

Mining is an important industry in Pakistan. Pakistan has deposits of several minerals including coal, copper, gold, chromite, mineral salt, bauxite and several other minerals. There are also a variety of precious and semi-precious minerals that are also mined. These include peridot, aquamarine, topaz, ruby, emerald, rare-earth minerals bastnaesite and xenotime, sphene, tourmaline, and many varieties and types of quartz.

The Pakistan Mineral Development Corporation is the responsible authority for the support and development of the mining industry. The Gemstones Corporation of Pakistan looks after the interests of stake holders in gemstone mining and polishing as an official entity. Balochistan has the most mineral deposits among the provinces of Pakistan, with Sindh rich in coal deposit and Khyber Pakhtunkhwa rich in gems. Oil, gas and minerals used in nuclear energy purposes are mined by the federal government. The mining of other minerals is a provincial concern. Currently around 52 minerals are mined and processed in Pakistan.

== Mineral salt ==
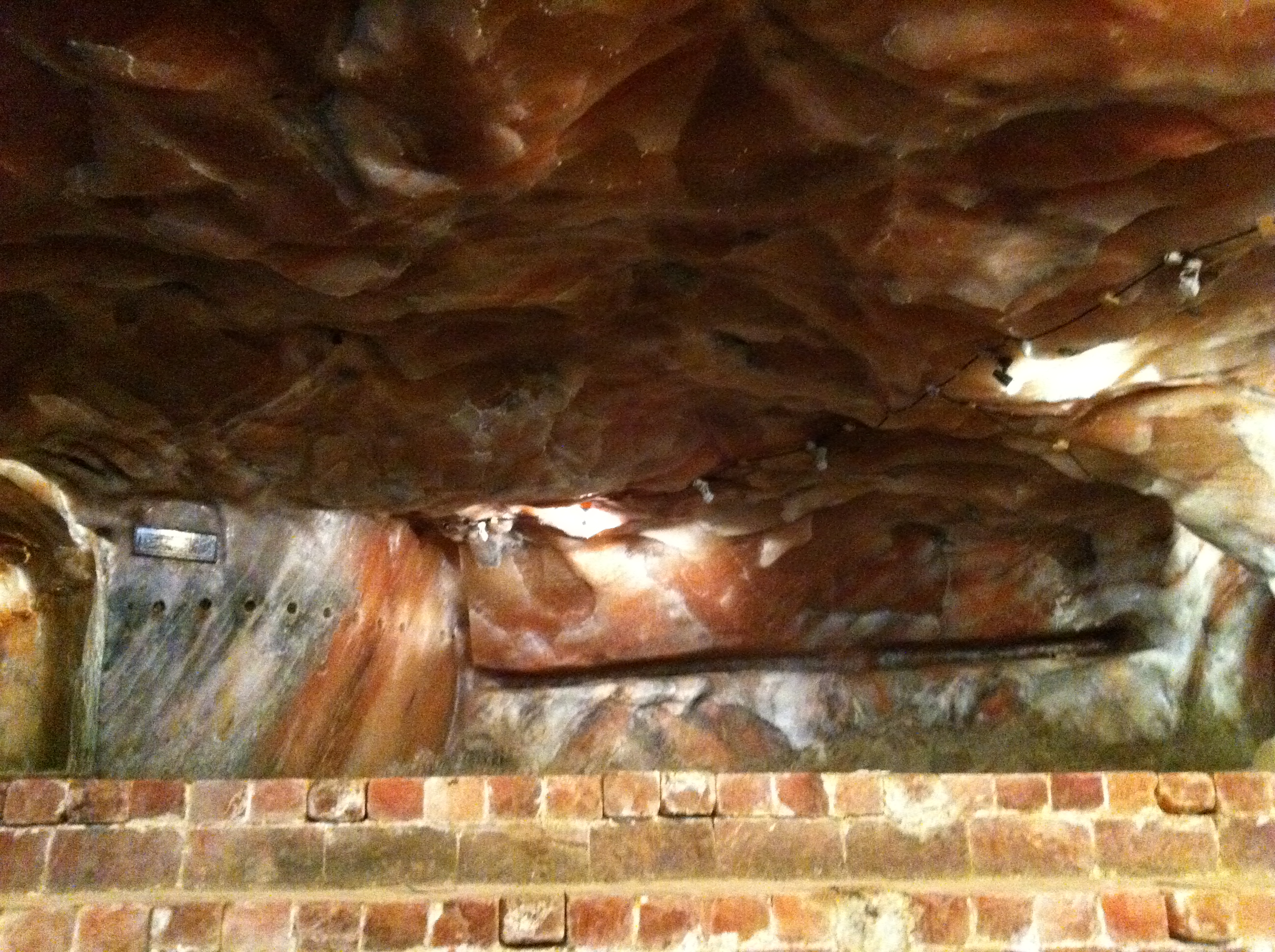
Rock salt makes for some beautiful texture on the walls and the ceiling

Salt has been mined in the region since 320 BC. The Khewra Salt Mines are among the world's oldest and biggest salt mines. Salt is mined at Khewra in an underground area of about 110 square kilometres (42 mi^{2}). Khewra salt mine has an estimated total of 220 million tonnes of rock salt deposits. The current production from the mine is 325,000 tons of salt per annum.

== Copper and gold ==
In Reko Diq, Balochistan, deposits of copper and gold are present. Antofagasta, the company which possesses the Reqo Diq field, is targeting an initial production of 170,000 metric tons of copper and 8504 kg of gold a year. The project may produce more than 350,000 tons a year of copper and 408,233 kg of gold. There are also copper deposits in Daht-e-Kuhn, Nok Kundi, located in Chaghi District.

== Iron ore ==
Iron ore is found in various regions of Pakistan including Nokundi, Chiniot, Kalabagh the largest one, Haripur and other northern areas.

In February 2015, reserves were found in Chiniot, around 160 kilometres northwest of Lahore, by a Chinese group, the Metallurgical Cooperation of China. A senior provincial administrative official told AFP that initial estimates indicated 500 million tonnes of iron ore had been discovered. The extracted iron had been tested in Swiss and Canadian laboratories, which were successful in finding 60-65 percent of it to be high grade.

== Gems and other precious stones ==
A number of precious stones are mined and polished for local as well as export purposes. The centre point of this operation is Khyber-Pakhtoonkhwa and most recently Gilgit-Baltistan. These include actinolite, hessonite, rodingite, agate, idocrase, rutile, aquamarine, jadeite, ruby, amazonite, kunzite, serpentine, azurite, kyanite, spessartine (garnet), beryl, morganite, spinel, emerald, moonstone, topaz, epidote, pargasite, tourmaline, garnet (alamandine), peridot, turquoise, grossular, quartz (citrine and other varieties) and vesuvianite. The export earned from these gems is more than 200 Million dollars.

== Accidents in the mining industry ==
Mining in Pakistan is a dangerous job, especially coal mining, as safety procedures are often neglected and accidents are quite common. There is air pollution with no modern safety equipment such as breathing equipment or ventilation. Nearly all miners have lung problems and many suffer from carbon monoxide poisoning. But the main causes of death and injury are falls from cliffs, being buried when mines collapse and being hit by falling rocks.

- On 27 January 2019, two miners died after being hit by a trolley inside a coal mine in Balochistan's coal-rich Dukki District.
- On 21 March 2011 at least 45 miners died due to an explosion in a coal mine in Surran range, some 35 km (22 mi) east of the provincial capital, Quetta.
- On 14 February 2011, 2 Chinese engineers died in a chromite mine collapse in Qila Saifullah.
- On 27 May 2004, 15 miners died after a gas explosion at a coal mine in Balochistan.

== See also ==
- Coal mining in Pakistan
- Economy of Pakistan
- List of minerals found in Pakistan
