= Saindak Dam =

Dam in Balochistan, Pakistan

- Location within Pakistan
- Country: Pakistan
- Location: Chagai District, Balochistan
- Coordinates: 29°14′24.99″N 61°38′53.03″E
- Owner: Government of Balochistan

Saindak Dam is located in the desert of Saindak/Reko Diq, about 50 km away from the Iran border, in Baluchistan, Pakistan.

== See also ==
List of dams and reservoirs in Pakistan
