= Jinfeng Gold Mine =

Gold mine in Guizhou, China

- Location in China
- Location: Guizhou, People's Republic of China; 25°8′55″N 105°52′16″E
- Products: Gold
- Production: 177,757
- Financial year: 2011
- Type: Open pit/Underground
- Opened: 2007
- Company: China National Gold Group Corporation
- Website: www.chinagoldgroup.com/eng/
- Acquired: 2016

The Jinfeng Gold Mine (Chinese: 金峰金矿) is a combined open pit and underground gold mining operation in the Guizhou province, China. The mine is owned by China National Gold Group Corporation. It was originally owned by Sino Gold Mining and then acquired by Eldorado Gold in 2009. Eldorado Gold sold its 82% stake in the Jinfeng Gold Mine to a wholly owned subsidiary of China National Gold Group for ~US$300 million in September 2016.

Production at Jinfeng began in 2007.

== History ==
The deposit was discovered in 1986, Sino Gold Mining received the mining licence in 2001. Sino Gold's investment in the mine was the largest mining investment in the People's Republic of China by a foreign company, and the first foreign company to mine gold in the PRC. Construction of the Jinfeng Gold Mine started in 2005, and gold production began in 2007. Eldorado Gold acquired the property when they purchased Sino Gold in 2009. As of 2010 Jinfeng was still the largest foreign-owned gold mine, and the second largest gold mine in the PRC. Despite owning the second largest gold mine in the country, in 2010 Eldorado only accounted for 3% of the PRCs total gold output.

== Geology ==
The deposit at the Jinfeng Gold Mine is a Carlin-type gold deposit (similar to those found in Nevada) in the "Laizhishan Dome" located in a region known as the "Golden Triangle". The Laizhishan Dome is made up of sedimentary rocks from the Silurian through the Late Triassic periods. The deposit itself is located between five faults, with gold being associated with pyrite and arsenopyrite.
