= Angela Anderson =

German artist and filmmaker

Angela Olga Anderson is a German artist, filmmaker, and exhibition designer. She has done exhibition design for the Forum Expanded program at the Berlinale Film Festival. Anderson's work as an artist and filmmaker explores themes of ecology, economics, migration, and feminist and queer theory. She lives and works in Berlin.

== Early life ==
Anderson received her Bachelor of Arts in Economics and Latin American Studies from the University of Minnesota (2006). She obtained her Master of Arts in Film and Media Studies from the New School in New York City (2010).

== Career ==
Since 2013, Anderson has collaborated with the artist Angela Melitopoulos and anti-mining activists of Northeastern Greece in a series of projects. This collaborative initiative has produced two films and a radio project on the movement against Skouries mine in northern Greece. In 2016, Anderson released "The Sea Between You and Me," a short film that focused on the island of Lesbos as both a mythological place of refuge and a contemporary escape route for refugees.

That same year, Anderson was included in Voices Outside the Echo Chamber, a group exhibition that also featured work by Lawrence Abu Hamdan, Ólafur Ólafsson, and Banu Cennetoglu, among other artists. The exhibition aimed to explore the concept of "echo chambers," particularly in the context of online filter bubbles and refugee migration to Europe. In 2017, Anderson released Unearthing Disaster I & II, a video installation (in collaboration with Angela Melitopoulos) that was produced in 2013 and 2015, respectively. The videos focus on the destruction of Greek forest region by Eldorado Gold, a Canadian mining company, and scenes depicted clashes between local activists and the police. The film was presented in conjunction with an ecological conference at University of California, Santa Cruz and shown to audiences at Minnesota Street Project in San Francisco.

From 2018 to 2019, Anderson worked on "Three (or more) Ecologies." The title was made in reference to the writings of Felix Guattari. In this work, Anderson created a composition that included a variety of media, including documentary footage, music, and text, and explored "...the most recent iteration of my ongoing research into the seemingly perpetual conflict between ‘labor’ and ‘nature’ in the context of industrial development," according to Anderson.

== Works ==
- Three (or more) Ecologies (2018-2019)
- Unearthing Disaster I & II (2013 & 2015, respectively)
- The Sea between You and Me, short film (2016)
- The Sea Between You and Me (2016)
- Unearthing Disaster, 2013-2015 (with Angela Melitopoulos)
- Radio Schizoanalytique – Transmissions from the Fold (2015)
- The Refrain (2015), by Angela Melitopoulos in collaboration with Angela Anderson, Aya Hanabusa, and Maurizio Lazzarato

== Exhibitions ==
- Group Exhibition: Voices Outside the Echo Chamber (2016)
- Thessaloniki Biennale (2015)
- A Special Arrow was Shot through the Neck, David Roberts Art Foundation (2014)
- Berliner Herbst Salon (2013)
