= Inland Freight Equalization Margin =

The Inland Freight Equalization Margin (IFEM) is a regulatory measure implemented in Pakistan to equalize the price of petroleum products across different regions of the country. It includes the costs for refineries to transport crude oil from its source to their facilities, as well as the expenses for Oil Marketing Companies (OMCs) to distribute these finished products to various depots across the country. The IFEM is a component in the retail price of fuel, directly affecting the price per litre paid by consumers at Oil Marketing Company (OMC) outlets.

The IFEM is used in setting prices for various petroleum products, including motor spirit (MS), light diesel oil (LDO), superior kerosene oil (SKO), and high-speed diesel (HSD). It is used to maintain consistent pricing throughout the country, compensating for disparities in transportation expenses.

== History ==
The Oil and Gas Regulatory Authority (OGRA) has been tasked with the calculation and implementation of the IFEM since September 1, 2008. OGRA also manages IFEM fund.

== Margin determination ==
The determination of demand and supply for OMCs is conducted during the monthly Product Review Meeting organized by the Ministry of Energy (Petroleum Division). Subsequently, the IFEM is calculated by OGRA in coordination with representatives from OMCs and refineries. The mechanism allows new OMCs to claim IFEM based on their marketing licenses and supply agreements. This process involves balancing local refinery production with import needs to meet national demand.

== Oversight ==
OGRA also monitors the movement of petroleum products among OMCs. This involves checking monthly transport volumes, depot sales, refinery purchases, and the use of tracker-fitted tank lorries to ensure accurate delivery and prevent misuse of the IFEM. Regular inspections of tank lorries at depots are part of this oversight process.
