= Mashki Chah =

Village in Balochistan, Pakistan

Mashki Chah مشکی چاہ
- Village
- Location within Pakistan
- Coordinates: 29°00′29″N 62°27′02″E
- Country: Pakistan
- Province: Balochistan
- District: Western Chaghi

Population (2023)
  - Total: 32+
- Time zone: PKT
  - Summer (DST): PKT

Mashki Chah (Urdu: مشکی چاہ) is a small village in the extreme west of Pakistan in the province of Balochistan. It is around 42 kilometres (26 miles) from Pakistan's border with Afghanistan and 64 kilometres (40 miles) from Pakistan's border with Iran. 36 kilometres (22 miles) from Mashki Chah is the township and region of Naukundi.

Around 4 kilometres (2.5 miles) southwest of Mashki Chah is the Reko Diq Mine, one of the world's largest Gold and Copper mine with estimated reserves of 5.9 billion tonnes of ore.
