= EGU =

EGU or eGU may refer to:

- E-Government Unit, of the Cabinet Office of the government of the United Kingdom
- Eagle Air (Uganda), a Ugandan airline
- English Golf Union, now merged into England Golf
- European Geosciences Union, an interdisciplinary science learned association
- European Goldfields, a Canadian mining company
- Gnostic Church of France (French: Église Gnostique Universelle
- Patrick Egu (born 1967), Nigerian American football player
