= Oil & Gas Regulatory Authority =

Regulatory authority in Pakistan

- Emblem of the OGRA

Government agency overview
- Formed: 2002; 24 years ago
- Preceding Government agency: Oil & Gas Regulatory Authority (OGRA)
- Headquarters: Plot No. 37 & 39, Mauve Area, Service Road South, Sector G-10/4, Islamabad
- Government agency executive: Masroor Khan, Chairman
- Parent department: Government of Pakistan
- Website: ogra.org.pk

Oil & Gas Regulatory Authority (Urdu: اختیاریہ برائے ضابطہَ تیل و گیس, abbreviated as OGRA) is an agency of the Government of Pakistan, responsible for regulating the oil and gas sector in Pakistan. It was established in 2002.

== History ==
On 28 March 2002 the Federal Government of Pakistan established Oil and Gas Regulatory Authority (OGRA), in pursuance of the Oil and Gas Regulatory Authority Ordinance, 2002. The Natural Gas Regulatory Authority (NGRA) was subsumed by the OGRA, all properties and works done by the NGRA were transferred to and protected under the OGRA Ordinance.

== Organization ==
Chairman/Chairperson heads OGRA, along with three Members to oversee Gas, Finance and Oil affairs related to authority. Each member can serve for maximum two terms subject to retirement on attaining the age of 65 years. Chairman and members are being appointed by federal government through a competitive process on tenure basis in accordance with the provisions of the OGRA Ordinance. Currently chairman OGRA & member oil seats are vacant, Shakeel Ahmed (Member Finance), Shahzad Iqbal (Member Gas).

== Functions ==
Section 6 of the OGRA Ordinance give powers to the authority. OGRA has the exclusive power to grant licenses for regulated activities in the natural gas, compressed natural gas (CNG), liquefied petroleum gas (LPG), liquefied natural gas (LNG) and oil sector. These activities include construction of pipelines, development of transmission and distribution network, sale and storage of natural gas, installation, production, storage, transportation and marketing of CNG, LPG and LNG, laying the pipelines, establishing/operating refineries, construction/operation of storages, lube oil blending plants and marketing of petroleum products in the oil sector.

Some of the specific major functions are:

- Determination of revenue requirement and prescribed prices of natural gas utilities and notification of prescribed and consumers sale prices.
- Computes & notifies ex-refinery price of SKO including ex-depot prices of SKO & E-10 and Inland Freight Equalization Margin (IFEM) for all products.
- Monitoring the pricing of petroleum products under the deregulated scenario.
- Enforcement of technical standards and specifications (best international practices) in all the regulated activities.
- Resolution of public complaints and disputes against lincesees and between licensees

== See also ==
- Inland Freight Equalization Margin
- Mining in Pakistan
- Fuel extraction in Pakistan
- List of minerals of Pakistan
