= Warcha salt mine =

Active salt mine in Punjab, Pakistan

- Location within Punjab, Pakistan Location within Pakistan
- Location: Warcha, Punjab, Pakistan, Pakistan; 32°24′46″N 71°57′57″E
- Products: Sodium chloride
- Opened: 1872
- Company: Pakistan Mineral Development Corporation

Warcha salt mine is an active salt mine located in village Warcha, Khushab District of Punjab, Pakistan, with over 1 billion tonnes reserves of 98% pure (on-average), transparent and crystalline Sodium chloride salt. Warcha salt mine was launched in 1872, and is still producing over 200,000 tons of rock salt annually with the potential to double its production capacity.

== History ==
During the Mughal era, Warcha was a princely state ruled by the Phulial family, who are a sub-caste of the Awan tribe. The rulers of the state, of whom Nawab Surkhuru was the last, was called the Chief of Warcha. In 1834, after the collapse of the Mughal Empire, Sardar Hari Singh Nalwa, the Commander in Chief of the Sikh Army conquered and took control of Warcha including all local mines.

In 1860s, the British government took over the Warcha mine and gave administrative control of all local mines to the Excise and Custom Department of British India, which for the first time introduced the room and pillar mining method in the Warcha mine itself. They later started development of the main mine in 1868, which started production in 1872.

In 1962, the Warcha salt mine was handed over to the West Pakistan Industrial Development Corporation. Since 1974, the mine has been owned and managed by the Pakistan Mineral Development Corporation.

== See also ==
- List of mines in Pakistan
- Khewra Salt Mine
