= Petroleum Division (Pakistan) =

Division of the Government of Pakistan

Agency overview
- Formed: April 1977
- Jurisdiction: Government of Pakistan
- Headquarters: Block A, Pak Secretariat; Islamabad, ICT, Pakistan. 44000.
- Minister responsible: Ali Pervaiz Malik
- Agency executive: Mirza Nasiruddin Mashhood Ahmed, Secretary Petroleum Division
- Parent department: Ministry of Energy
- Website: petroleum.gov.pk

The Petroleum Division, part of Pakistan's Ministry of Energy, is tasked with ensuring a secure and sustainable supply of oil and gas to meet the country's economic and strategic needs. It also oversees the development of natural energy resources and minerals. Previously a standalone ministry, the Petroleum Division was merged into the Ministry of Energy in August 2017.

== History of the Ministry ==
Petroleum & Natural Resources Division was created in April 1977. Prior to that Petroleum and Natural Resources was part of the Ministry of Fuel, Power and Natural Resources.

== Wings /Sections ==
- Directorate General of Gas
- Directorate General of LNG & LPG
- Directorate General of Oil
- Directorate General of Petroleum Concession
- Human Resource and Administration Wing
- International Joint Venture Wing

== Organizations ==
=== Geological Survey of Pakistan ===
The Geological Survey of Pakistan is an autonomous and independent institution under Ministry of Petroleum and Natural Resources which is tasked and mandate with advancing the geoscience knowledge and carrying out systematic studies on official mapping and area surveying.

=== Government Holdings Private Limited ===
Government Holdings Private Limited (GHPL) was registered as private limited company in 2000 under the Companies Ordinance 1984. It is 100% owned by the Government of Pakistan and operates under the Ministry of Petroleum and Natural Resources. The purpose of creating this company was to separate the regulatory and commercial functions to efficiently manage the Government's interest in petroleum exploration and production joint ventures which was previously managed by Directorate General of Petroleum Concession. GHPL had a mandatory 5% interest in all Exploration Licenses granted by the Government during the exploration phase which was to be carried by other joint venture partners. This working interest was to increase in case of commercial discovery from 15% to 25% depending on the discovery zone.

=== Oil and Gas Development Company ===
OGDCL is the national oil & gas company of Pakistan and the flagship of the country's exploration and production sector.

=== Pakistan Mineral Development Corporation ===
PMDC is an autonomous corporation under the administrative control of Ministry of Petroleum and Natural Resources, Government of Pakistan. It was established in 1974 to expand and help mineral development activities in the country. It is involved in exploration and evaluation of economic mineral deposits, preparation of techno-economic feasibility reports, mining and marketing.

=== Pakistan Petroleum ===
Pakistan Petroleum Limited (Reporting name: PPL or PP) was incorporated on June 5, 1950, when it inherited the assets and liabilities of the Burmah Oil Company Ltd.

The company is headquartered in Karachi. It operates major oil and gas fields, including the Sui gas field, has non-operating interests in other fields, and has an interest in an exploration portfolio onshore and offshore.

=== Inter State Gas Systems ===
Inter State Gas Systems (Private) Limited (ISGS) was established in 1996 as a private limited company.

In order to meet the growing energy deficit in the country, the Government of Pakistan (GOP), besides encouraging local exploration and production, plans to import natural gas from across its borders from Iran and Turkmenistan.

ISGS has been mandated by the Government to develop natural gas import projects, and to serve as an interface between the GOP and other national and international agencies for the import and storage of natural gas in Pakistan.

=== Saindak Metals Limited ===
Saindak Copper-Gold Project of Saindak Metals Limited (SML) is an organization of Ministry of Petroleum and Natural Resources, Government of Pakistan engaged in exploration processing of copper-gold, silver and allied minerals.

=== Lakhra Coal Development Company Limited ===
Lakhra Coal Development Company Limited (LCDC), was incorporated as a Public Limited Company in 1990 under Companies Ordinance 1984. The company is a joint venture of Pakistan Mineral Development Corporation (PMDC), Government of Sindh (GOS) and Water & Power Development Authority (WAPDA).

Prime objective of the company is to develop Lakhra Coal Mines to supply coal to 150 MW Thermal Plant of LPGCL (WAPDA) at Khanote which was originally planned for 6x50 MW with annual coal consumption of 15,00,000 M.Tonnes.

== See also ==
- Energy policy of Pakistan
