= Frank Timiș =

Romanian-Australian businessman (born 1964)

- Born: Vasile Frank Timiș; 28 January 1964 (age 62); Borșa, Maramureș County, People's Republic of Romania
- Known for: Industrialist, Natural Resources

Vasile Frank Timiș (born 1964) is a Romanian-Australian businessman living in London, with interests in mining and oil extraction industries. The Sunday Times Rich List estimated his wealth at £10 billion as of April 2008, making him the 497th richest person in the world. The Romanian magazine Capital reckoned Timiș to be the 9th richest Romanian, estimating his wealth at $290m as of 2006. In 2012 he became the richest Romanian with a net worth of £1.34 billion (US$2.13 billion). A BBC News investigation alleged that Timiș paid £35.20 in tax in 2017 despite living a life of luxury, and included a statement from the Tax Justice Network suggesting that Timiș be investigated for tax fraud. In 2017, BP acquired Frank Timis's stake in a Senegal gas field for $250 million, with documents later revealing an additional $9–12 billion in royalties to be paid to Timis's company. Both parties deny wrongdoing, with Timis having an estimated net worth of $12 billion.

== Early life ==
Born in Borșa, Maramureș County, he graduated from a vocational school for auto mechanics. He left Romania and settled as a refugee in Perth, Western Australia. Whilst in Australia he was convicted of possession of heroin with intent to supply and fined A$27,000.

== Career ==
=== Companies in Australia ===
Timis was arrested twice for possession of heroin in the Eighties and was deemed "unsuitable" to be a director of a company by the Toronto Stock Exchange for failing to disclose those convictions. Timiș started his own transport company in Australia, which owned only one truck driven by himself. However, it went bankrupt in 1986 with debts of 15,806 AUD. According to Jurnalul Național, Timiș failed to declare this fact in the CV he published when he listed the company Gabriel Resources on the Toronto Stock Exchange, as required by law.

In 1992, he became the CEO of Morwest Holdings Pty Ltd, the first of his gold mining businesses. Timiș and two Australian miners dug for six months for gold in a region called Mosquito Creek, but the result was a failure. In the meantime, he founded another three companies: Riverdale Mining, Timis Corporation, and Carpathian Investments, together with Ioana Timiș and his sister, Ioana Majdik. However, these companies were liquidated by Timiș, and all creditors were paid in full.

Another setback was Timiș' investment in Pneumatic Systems International Pty Ltd. In 2001, he quit his investment and kept only 11.6% of the company, administered via a new company, Regal Group Services, in the British Virgin Islands tax haven. According to an ex-manager of the company, in 2003, those shares were worth under A$1,500.

Regal Group Services changed its name and headquarters, and is currently listed on the London Stock Exchange as Regal Petroleum. This company is associated with a Romanian company, Global Mineral Resources, owned by a son of a former Romanian senator of the Democratic Party, Teodor Hăucă, who used to be secretary of the Economic Commission of the Romanian Senate between 1996 and 2000.

=== Gabriel Resources ===
In 1995, Timiș founded Gabriel Resources NL Australia, and in the autumn of the same year, the Romanian state-owned mining company "Regia Autonomă a Cuprului din Deva" (RAC) announced that it was searching for a partnership with a foreign company for the mining of precious metals from the tailings in Roșia Montană and Gurabarză-Brad. However, Jurnalul Național claims that it has documents indicating a collaboration signed by RAC Deva and Gabriel Resources one day before the announcement was published, on 4 September 1995. Also, RAC claimed it received several offers, including from another Australian company, Lycopodium Pty Ltd., but that company has denied RAC's claim.

According to ASIC, in April 1996, Gabriel Resources NL had financial problems with its creditors, including the National Australia Bank, and Timiș started a new company after paying all creditors in full, Gabriel Resources Limited, registered in the Jersey tax haven. The mining contract was redirected to the new company. Timiș had an 80% stake in the joint company. The Romanian Agency of Mineral Resources declared that the new contract was unfavourable to the Romanian state, but it was allowed by the Government after a parliamentary vote.

Timiș had access to various databanks of the Romanian research institutes of mineralogy and got data on the area. His company also hired relevant scientists and an ex-officer of the Topographic Department of the Romanian Ministry of Defence who mapped the area.

Gabriel Resources sent 80 tonnes of ore to a research lab in Australia to measure the gold content. The ore was high in gold, and the market value of Gabriel Resources soared to $75 million. Timiș obtained a $3 million loan from the Rothschild bank in the United States. Between 1999 and 2000, the area being mined was increased from 12 km^{2} to 22 km^{2}, and then to 42.8 km^{2}.

The resulting project in Roșia Montană has been a source of much controversy, with local people lining up on both sides of the issue, and some national and international environmental groups joining the opposition. One source of controversy involved the method used for mining, gold cyanidation, which causes pollution. The company hopes to eventually extract 300 tonnes of gold and 1600 tonnes of silver from the area but the project is currently on hold.

=== Regal Petroleum ===
Regal Petroleum, founded by Timiș in November 1996, was listed on the London Alternative Investment Market and owned some oil and gas resources in Romania and Ukraine. However, it became famous after the September 2003 acquisition of 60% of an oilfield located in Kavala, Greece. The Regal board hoped that the company's survey team had found one of the largest oil deposits in Europe: up to a billion barrels. The oil was allegedly under so much pressure that it almost destroyed the drilling platform.

This hype drove Regal's share price up to a peak of 509p, with the company's market value reaching £500m, making it one of the highest-valued companies of the Alternative Investment Market. Many private investors and respectable institutions (including Merrill Lynch, Commerzbank, Artemis and Schroders) invested more than £45m in the company. Days later, Timiș secretly agreed to sell the company's assets and then resigned as chief executive of the company.

By mid-2005, it was clear that Regal's oil field contained oil but not in commercial amounts. The flow rates were around 30 barrels a day and "deemed to be non-commercial". In a few hours, the stock fell by more than 60%, and as of June 2006, the share price was at 65p, less than 20% of the peak price. In 2010, the company was still worth about £200m, and had cash reserves of £80m, In February 2006, Regal lost its Ukraine gas production license in a trial but got it back through appeal one year later.

In June 2005, an environmental group, Alburnus Maior, asked the Romanian Supreme Court, under the freedom of information laws, whether Timiș was under any investigations. The answer was that his name was linked with three dossiers investigated by the organised crime department. However, Timiș denied all the claims and no charges were ever filed. Later queries to the Romanian administration on this subject were given the answer that there are no investigations concerning Timiș.

Due to the collapse in the share price of this company, the Alternative Investment Market decided in 2006 to toughen regulations for companies in the natural resources sector and to hire experts who would prevent future bubbles followed by price fluctuations.

=== African Minerals (AMI.L, was Sierra Leone Diamond Corporation) ===
In 2005, the Timiș Trust bought 30% of the shares of the Sierra Leone Diamond Corporation, via the Trust's Bermuda-registered Timis Diamond Corporation Limited. SLDC holds mineral rights over a third of the area of Sierra Leone in the northern part of the country, including some important diamond fields and the Tonkolili & Marampa Iron Ore Projects. The company is also exploring for uranium at Lovetta, and for gold and base metals in the Sula Mountains, Gori Hills and Nimini Hills. On 16 August 2007 the AIM-listed company was renamed African Minerals Limited (AMI.L) to reflect these other interests., On 15 March 2010 AMI announced an initial Mineral Resource estimate of over 10 billion tonnes of iron ore (independently valued) at an average grade of 29.9% Total Iron in the Numbara and Simbili targets at Tonkolili.

Timiș, who is executive chairman of the company, increased his shareholding to 34% in June 2006 and to 34.6% (40,875,002 shares) in September 2006. As of February 2009 the entire company was worth £45m (US$65m).

In 2015, Frank Timis together with then CEO Alan Watling and CFO Matthew Hird took African Minerals into administration. The company has been forced to sell its 75% share to Shandong Iron and Steel Group for a grossly undervalued sum. Half year results for AMI were impressive, the Company posted a quarterly production of 4mt – an improvement of 81% on the prior 3 months. In January 2014 AMI hit its operating capacity for the first time, producing 5.3mt and exporting 4.6mt in the first quarter. Earnings for the company were US$203m in 2013 compared with a US$26.5m in 2012. Despite the best efforts of the team and management, the continued downturn in iron ore prices, slowing global growth and China's appetite and the Ebola crisis (which infected almost 15,000 and claimed 4,000 lives) left AMI exposed. The downturn in iron ore prices from US$128.12 in January 2014 decreased rapidly over coming months reaching US$68 in December 2014 and US$63 in February 2015. This combined with the Ebola crises created a perfect storm for the beleaguered mining company. Shandong refused to release remaining funds (US$100m) and their lawyers Linklater's recognised a perfect opportunity to take over buying 75% of AMI shares at a grossly undervalued price and through a process that was anything but transparent. The Board, management and Timis fought passionately to keep the company from going to administration, but given the perfect storm it was facing and like many other junior mining Companies then and since, there was no alternative but administration. Timis lost all of his $450m investment as did the institution investors, shareholders and bond holders. AMI was operating as Shan Steel under Chinese leadership until they recently left the Tonkolili project with the loss of all jobs created by Frank Timis and AML.

His Timis Corporation controversially bought the operations of London Mining, another iron ore miner in Sierra Leone, out of administration shortly before African Minerals went bust.

=== African Petroleum ===
Timiș was formerly the non-executive chairman of African Petroleum, he stepped off the board and any role in Governance in African Petroleum in October 2014 and this remained a precondition of the subsequent and current listing on the Oslo Bors. He remains the founder and a supportive shareholder but plays no other role African Petroleum Corporation is a company with various oil and gas operations in West Africa, listed on the National Stock Exchange of Australia (NSX: AOQ) and Oslo Bors (APCL).

=== International Petroleum ===
Timiș is a non-executive director at International Petroleum Limited, an Australian-domiciled, NSX-listed (NSX code: IOP), oil and gas exploration and production company.

=== Pan African Minerals ===
Timiș is CEO of Pan African Minerals Limited, which has various operations in Africa, including exploration of a large manganese deposit at Tambao in Burkina Faso.

=== European Goldfields ===
In 2000 Frank Timiș bought 15% of European Goldfields (EGU.L), a Yukon-incorporated company listed in Toronto and on AIM that owns 95% of Hellas Gold S.A. 21% of that stake was acquired by EGU from Timiș himself in 2004 for $77.3m, paid a third in cash and two-thirds in EGU shares, taking his stake to 18.9%. Hellas has three mining projects in Greece (Stratoni, Skouries and Olympias) and two companies in Romania: 100% of the shares of European Goldfields Deva (with projects at Voia and the Cainel perimeter) and 80% of the shares in Deva Gold, Certej Mine, Bolcana and Băița-Crăciunești.

He sold his entire stake in the company between January and April 2006.

== Allegations of tax fraud ==
A BBC News investigation accused Timiș of paying only £35.20 in income tax in 2017, despite living a life of luxury. The BBC alleged that payments received in 2017 totalling £670,000 from an offshore trust were described retrospectively as untaxable loans to avoid paying taxes on them. John Christiansen, Director and chair of the Board of the Tax Justice Network, told the BBC that Timiș appeared to be dodging tax: "It all points to this being a manoeuvre to cheat the tax man. And, if that is the case, because it's been done retrospectively, there seems to be prima facie evidence that this is tax fraud and it should be investigated." Timiș's lawyers told the BBC that he has fully complied with all of his tax obligations.

== Allegations of corruption and legal scrutiny ==
Investigative journalism by BBC Panorama and Africa Eye accuses Frank Timiș of corruptly acquiring exploration rights of Cayar Offshore Profond and St. Louis Offshore Profond blocks, off the coast of Senegal. In 2012, Timiș-owned company called Petro-Tim was awarded a licence to explore the blocks despite having no known track record in the industry. Soon after, Aliou Sall, the brother of the President of Senegal, Macky Sall, was hired by the company, allegedly to ensure Petro-Tim could keep these rights. The BBC program further alleges that Petro-Tim paid tax worth US$250,000 to the President's brother instead of the Senegalese government. Further accusations concern the involvement of Kosmos Energy and BP in the development of the field, potentially leading to billion-dollar royalty payments from BP to Timis Corporation. Timiș has denied the accusations.

In 2024, criminal investigations involving Frank Timiș were closed by several Western authorities. The U.S. Department of Justice and the U.K. Serious Fraud Office dropped their respective investigations, and the Swiss Attorney General’s Office issued a closure order in January 2025, citing a lack of concrete evidence.

In December 2024, the Senegalese Revenue Authority issued an administrative notice to Timiș demanding payment of CFA 159 billion (approximately €240 million) in alleged tax arrears related to a controversial oil deal involving African Petroleum and BP. While the matter remains administrative, failure to comply could lead to a trial. According to Africa Intelligence, sources close to Timiș claim he suspects BP of attempting to gather information about him through his nephew, Ian Timis, a former executive at African Petroleum.

== Politics ==
In 2010, he donated £100,000 to the British Christian Party for the general election.
