= Ghulam Ahmad (forester) =

Pakistani forestry official (1923–2003)

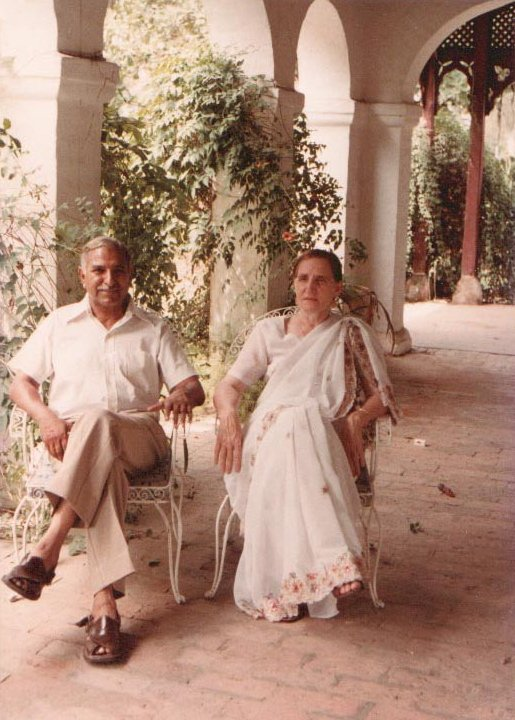
- Born: 23 May 1923; Poonch, Poonch district, Jammu and Kashmir , British India
- Died: 20 September 2003 (aged 80); New Jersey, United States
- Education: Delft University of Technology; Colorado State University; University of Punjab
- Known for: Environmental sciences
- Spouse: Jamila Begum
- Children: Dr. Rehana Kausar; Khalid Adnan; Dr. Khalida Yasmin; Tariq Ahmad; Mobashir Ahmad
- Scientific career
- Fields: Civil Engineer
- Workplaces: Pakistan Forest Service (PFS); Colorado Department of Military Affairs (DMA); Pakistan Chrome Mines Ltd (PCM); Military Engineering Service (MES)

Shaikh Ghulam Ahmad (23 May 1923 – 20 September 2003) was a Pakistani forestry official Report on Pankora Valley forests and later managing director and chairman of Pakistan Chrome Mines Ltd, the largest and oldest chrome mining company in Pakistan.

In World War II he served in the Royal Indian Air Force as an Engineer Officer, Fighter Pilot and Military Engineer.

== Career ==
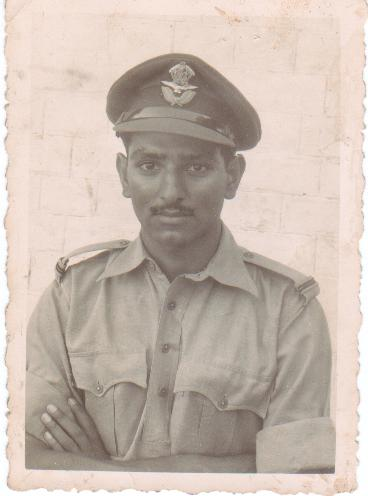
Ghulam Ahmad, Royal Indian Air Force

He joined the Royal Indian Air Force as a fighter pilot in the No. 1 Squadron, Indian Air Force. He fought against the Japanese Imperial Army in Burma during Second World War flying in a Hawker Hurricane fighter plane.

He was selected for the Forest Service after World War II and trained at the Forest Research Institute at Dehradun, India. After the independence of Pakistan in 1947 he joined the Pakistan Forest Service, becoming the chief conservator of forests and director of the Aerial Survey Project in Peshawar, Pakistan, where he surveyed the North-West Frontier Province for a natural resources survey from 1965 to 1969. He introduced hybrid poplars in Pakistan, including Azad Kashmir, and especially Rawalakot, changing the living conditions of the rural population.

He supervised an aerial survey of the Indus River Basin for the development of natural resources. He emigrated to the United States in August 1971 to complete a PhD in civil engineering at Colorado State University, and joined the Colorado Department of Military Affairs, where he helped to draft the emergency response plan for Colorado. From 1983 until 1999 he was the managing director of Pakistan Chrome Mines Ltd.

== Author ==
He authored Unique and Everliving, a biography of the Islamic prophet, Muhammad. The book was written over a period of five years. The book is published by Ferozeson's Ltd., a book publisher in Pakistan.National Library of Australia This book widely available in libraries in the United States including the Library of Congress National Library of Congress

== Personal life and death ==
Ahmad married Jamila Begum (1 Oct 1933 – 15 June 2021). Jamila was born in Rehara and died at age 87 in Dallas, Texas. Together, they had five children.

Ahmad died on 20 September 2003 (aged 80) in New Jersey, United States.
