= Amuri =

Amuri may refer to:

- Amuri, Cook Islands
- Amuri, New Zealand
- Amuri, Pakistan
- Amuri, Tampere, Finland
