= SGX =

SGX may refer to:

- Singapore Exchange, the securities and derivatives exchange of Singapore
- Sino Gold Mining, Australian mining company (ticker SGX on the Australian Stock Exchange)
- Songea Airport (IATA airport code), Tanzania
- PowerVR SGX, graphics chipset
- Software Guard Extensions, security extensions for Intel microprocessors
