= Jhimpir coal mine =

Coal mine in Sindh, Pakistan

Jhimpir Coal Mine
- Location: Sindh, Pakistan
- Products: Coking coal

The Jhimpir Coal Mine is a coal mine located in Sindh. The mine has coal reserves amounting to 161 million tonnes of coking coal, one of the largest coal reserves in Asia and the world.

== See also ==
- Coal mining in Pakistan
- List of mines in Pakistan
