= Chamalang Coal Mines =

Coal mines in Balochistan, Pakistan

- Location of Chamalang Coal Mines in Pakistan

Location
- Location: Balochistan, Pakistan; 30°4′54.51″N 69°21′51.78″E

Chamalang Coal Mines are extended over in the districts of Kohlu, Barkhan, and mostly concentrated in Loralai and expands over an area of 500 square miles. The high-quality Chamalang coal mines were first discovered in 1885 when the region was under British control. The mines are the second largest in Asia.

Since 1974, due to a long-lasting tribal clash between the Luni and Marri tribes the area was deprived of its true potential. In 2006, Pakistan Army helped facilitate an agreement between the Lunis and Balochistan government. The government nominated Senator Mohabat Khan Marri as its representative. Resultantly, on December 12, 2006, a tripartite agreement was signed among the Lunis, Marris and mine contractors. Since 2007, when the excavation commenced, 1.5 million tons of coal has been excavated which has generated Rs. 6 billion (US$21 million) in revenues. A total of 500 million tons of coal deposits have been confirmed which worth Rs. 2000 billion (US$7.2 billion).

Since 2007, approximately 55,000 jobs have been generated by the coal mines for the residents of Balochistan, Khyber-Pukhtunkhwa and Punjab. An estimated 73,926 people including Chamalang levies, contractors and labours have been employed in the coal mines. After Chaghi marble and Saindak Copper mines, Chamalang coal mines is the largest project in terms of revenue generation.

Chamalang and Bala Dhaka are two of the major villages of the area. The former is located about 35 miles (56 km), while the latter is about 28 miles (45 km) north of Kohlu in the Kohlu District. Pakistan Army has constructed a road from Mekhtar to Chamalang.

Chamalang coal mines contain coal ranging from high volatile C bituminous to high volatile A bituminous. Currently, 80 percent of Chamalang Coal is utilized by bricks makers and the remaining is consumed by cement industry which in order to reduce cost of production, blend it with imported coal. The quality of Chamalang coal is better than the rest of coal being mined from different coalfields in Balochistan.

== Security ==
Terrorist organizations like BLA, BRA etc. occasionally carryout attacks in the area. To ward of any threat to the work-force and the project, approximately 800 army personnel, 250 Frontier Corps, 450 Balochistan constabulary, 50 Kohlu Police and 2005 personnel of Chamalang Levies all from Marri tribes were employed for security of the project.

External videos
- Black Pearl - Chamalang Documentary Part 1
- Black Pearl - Chamalang Documentary Part 2
