= Bahadurkhel mine =

- Location within Khyber Pakhtunkhwa Location within Pakistan

Location
- Location: Bahadur Khel, Khyber Pakhtunkhwa, Pakistan; 33°10′5″N 70°59′36″E

Production
- Products: Sodium chloride

The Bahadurkhel mine is a large salt mine located in the village Bahadur Khel, in the Pakistani province Khyber Pakhtunkhwa. Bahadurkhel represents one of the largest salt reserves in Pakistan having estimated reserves of 10.5 billion tonnes of NaCl.
