= Indus East coal mine =

Coal mine in Sindh, Pakistan

Indus East Coal Mine
- Location: Sindh, Pakistan
- Products: Coking coal

The Indus East Coal Mine is a coal mine located in Sindh, Pakistan. The mine has coal reserves amounting to 1.78 billion tonnes of coking coal, one of the largest coal reserves in Asia and the world. Indus East is part of the Sonda-Thatta Coalfields.

== See also ==
- List of mines in Pakistan
