= Dadukhel mine =

Gypsum mine in Pakistan

Location
- Location: Punjab, Pakistan

Production
- Products: Gypsum

The Dadukhel mine is one of the largest gypsum mines in Pakistan. The mine is located in Punjab. The mine has reserves amounting to 53 million tonnes of gypsum.

== See also ==
- List of mines in Pakistan
