= Mir Amanullah Notezai =

Pakistani politician

Member of the Provincial Assembly of Balochistan
- In office 2002 – 31 May 2018

Personal details
- Born: 30 September 1970 (age 56) Chagai District
- Party: Pakistan Muslim League (Q)

Mir Amanullah Notezai is a Pakistani politician who was a Member of the Provincial Assembly of Balochistan from 2002 to May 2018.

== Early life and education ==
He was born on 30 September 1970 in Chagai District.

He has a degree in Bachelor of Arts.

== Political career ==
He was elected to the Provincial Assembly of Balochistan as an independent candidate from Constituency PB-39 Chaghi in the 2002 Pakistani general election. He received 5,975 votes and defeated a candidate of Pakistan Muslim League (Q) (PML-Q).

He was re-elected to the Provincial Assembly of Balochistan as a candidate of PML-Q from Constituency PB-39 Chaghi in the 2008 Pakistani general election. He received 11,683 votes and defeated a candidate of Pakistan Peoples Party (PPP).

He was re-elected to the Provincial Assembly of Balochistan as a candidate of PML-Q from Constituency PB-39 Chaghi in the 2013 Pakistani general election. He received 13,376 votes and defeated a candidate of PPP.
