= Dera Ismail Khan mine =

Gypsum mine in Pakistan

- Location: Khyber Pakhtunkhwa, Pakistan
- Products: Gypsum

The Dera Ismail Khan mine is one of the largest gypsum mines in Pakistan. The mine is located in Khyber Pakhtunkhwa. The mine has reserves amounting to 90 million tonnes of gypsum.

== See also ==
- List of mines in Pakistan
