= Reko Diq Mine =

Gold and Copper Mines in Balochistan, Pakistan

- Location within Balochistan, Pakistan Location within Pakistan
- Location: Chagai District, Balochistan, Pakistan; 28°58′21″N 62°25′59″E
- Products: Copper and Gold

The Reko Diq Mine is a planned mining operation, located near Reko Diq town in Chagai District, Balochistan, Pakistan. Reko Diq represents one of the largest copper and gold reserves in the world having estimated reserves of 5.9 billion tonnes of ore grading 0.41% copper and gold reserves amounting to 41.5 million oz, and a mining life of at least 40 years. As per a 2025 formal feasibility study, based on prevailing market prices of approximately US$3,016 per ounce for gold and US$9,815 per tonne for copper, an official estimated that the total value of the projected yield would exceed US$60 billion, comprising around US$54 billion in gold and US$6 billion in copper.

The Reko Diq area is part of the Tethyan Magmatic Arc, extending through central and southeast Europe (Hungary, Romania, Bulgaria, Greece) Turkey, Iran and Pakistan through the Himalayan region into Myanmar, Malaysia, Indonesia and Papua New Guinea. It contains wealth of large copper-gold ore deposits of varying grades.

The eastern and central sections of the belt are well recognized hosting world class mineralization such as Grasberg mine, Batu Hijau in Indonesia, Ok Tedi Mine in Papua New Guinea and Sar Cheshmeh in Iran. Whereas in the eastern Europe it hosts world class porphyry/epithermal cluster of Bor, Majdanpek in Serbia and more recent developments include Skouries and Olympias Greece, and Çöpler in Turkey.

Reko Diq area is one of many eroded remnant volcanic centers in the Chagai volcanic chain of mountains which runs in an east–west line across Balochistan between the Quetta-Taftan Line railway and the border with Afghanistan. TCC, Tethyan Copper Company, has identified a large, low-grade copper-gold resource at Reko Diq.

In January 2023, Bristow and the Chief Minister of Balochistan signed a memorandum of agreement which specified the timetable for the disbursement of committed funds to the province, including advance royalties and social development funds, ensuring that the people of Balochistan start earning benefits from the project well before the mine goes into production, including releasing the first advance payment of $3mn to the Government of Balochistan.

During peak construction by the Toronto based Barrick Mining Corporation, the project is expected to employ 7,500 people and once in production it will create 4,000 long-term jobs during the expected 40-year life of the mine. The production is expected to begin in 2028. In April 2025 the International Finance Corporation (IFC) disbursed a $300 million loan to Pakistan for the Riko Diq project, and in June 2025, the IFC released another $700 million.

== Reko Diq Resources ==
The Antofagasta PLC controlled by majority shareholders Chile's Luksic Group holds a 50% interest in Tethyan Copper Company Limited (“Tethyan”), its joint venture with Barrick Gold Corporation (“Barrick”). Tethyan is seeking to develop the Reko Diq copper-gold deposit in the Chagai Hills District of the province of Balochistan in south-west Pakistan. Tethyan has held a 75% interest in an exploration licence encompassing the Reko Diq deposit, with the Government of Balochistan (the provincial authority) holding the remaining 25% interest, resulting in an effective interest for the Antofagasta group of 37.5%.

The mineral resource at Reko Diq is estimated at 5.9 billion tonnes with an average copper grade of 0.41% and an average gold grade of 0.22 g/tonne. The Group's 37.5% attributable share of this resource amounts to 2.2 billion tonnes.

The deposit at Reko Diq is a large low-grade copper porphyry, with total mineral resources of 5.9 billion tons of ore with an average copper grade of 0.41% and gold grade of 0.22 g/ton. From this, the economically mineable portion of the deposit has been calculated at 2.2 billion tons, with an average copper grade of 0.53% and gold grade of 0.30 g/ton, with an annual production estimated at 200,000 tons of copper and 250,000 ounces of gold contained in 600,000 tons of concentrate.

According to the extensive technical financial studies undertaken, in order to secure optimal ‘economies of scale’ efficiencies, and lower mining and processing costs, a large scale, state of the art mining and processing unit is required at Reko Diq.

=== Reko Diq Dispute ===
Tethyan completed the feasibility study in respect of the project and submitted this to the Government of Balochistan in August 2010. On 15 February 2011, Tethyan submitted an application to the Government of Balochistan in accordance with the Balochistan Mineral Rules for a mining lease. On 15 November 2011, Tethyan was notified by the Government of Balochistan that the Government had rejected its application for a mining lease. Tethyan has commenced two international arbitrations in order to protect its legal rights. Tethyan was victorious in the arbitration proceedings.

The ICSID tribunal had taken up the dispute between Pakistan and the TCC after the latter claimed $8.5bn when the mining authority of Balochistan rejected its application for a multi-million dollar mining lease in the province in 2011. According to details available on Tethyan's website, the Reko Diq Mining Project was to build and operate a world-class copper-gold open-pit mine at a cost of about $3.3 billion. The company says its 1998 agreement with the Balochistan government entitled it to the mining lease, subject only to routine government requirements. The project stalled in November 2011 after the application was rejected. Pakistani officials say the mining lease was terminated by the government because it was secured in a non-transparent manner. By then, the company had invested $220 million in Reko Diq.

The Australian mining company sought help from the World Bank arbitration tribunal in 2012, and it ruled against Pakistan in 2017, rejecting an earlier decision by the Supreme Court of Pakistan. The tribunal opted to use a formula for calculating damages for the canceled lease based on the assumed profits Tethyan might have earned from the mine over 56 years. In July 2019, the tribunal slapped a whopping $5.97 billion award against Pakistan for denying the mining lease to the Australian company. The award, of nearly $6 billion, including the damages award and interest, is equal to about two percent of Pakistan's GDP. Immediately thereafter, the TCC had commenced proceedings for the enforcement of the award. In November 2019, Pakistan had challenged the award and initiated proceedings seeking its annulment. In March 2021, the Auditor General of Pakistan (AGP) office announced that it had filed a request on November 8, 2019, for the annulment of the award rendered by the ICSID on July 12, 2019. Alongside the plea for annulment, Pakistan had also requested a provisional stay on the enforcement of the award issued against the country on November 18, 2019. Pakistan was granted the provisional stay upon initiating annulment proceedings after which a hearing to confirm the stay order took place over ‘video link’ in April this year. On September 16, 2020, the tribunal finally ruled in favour of Pakistan, confirming the stay on the enforcement of the award. The ICSID is still considering Pakistan's appeal against the penalty over its decision to cancel the Reko Diq mining lease for the TTC and a final hearing will take place in May 2021. Two members of the United States House of Representatives called on Field Marshal Syed Asim Munir, the Chief of Army Staff and Chief of Defence Forces, at the General Headquarters in Rawalpindi. The visit came as Washington moved to deepen its involvement in Balochistan's mineral sector. In December 2025, the US Export-Import Bank approved $1.25 billion in financing tied to the Reko Diq copper and gold project ;one of the largest US financing decisions in Pakistan's minerals sector; which US officials said could unlock up to $2 billion in American mining equipment and services and generate thousands of jobs in both countries. Reko Diq, in Chagai district near the Iran border, is a joint venture between Canada's Barrick Gold and the Pakistani federal and provincial governments, with production targeted for 2028; Saudi Arabia's Manara Minerals has signalled interest in a stake.
