= Kumhar mine =

Magnesium mine in Khyber Pakhtunkhwa, Pakistan

- Location: Khyber Pakhtunkhwa, Pakistan
- Products: Magnesium

The Kumhar mine is one of the largest magnesium mines in Pakistan and in the world. The mine is located in the north of the country in the Khyber Pakhtunkhwa. The mine has estimated reserves of 14 million tonnes of ore 46% magnesium.

== See also ==
- List of mines in Pakistan
