= Sonda-Thatta coal mine =

Coal mine in Sindh, Pakistan

Sonda-Thatta Coal Mine
- Location: Sindh, Pakistan
- Products: Coking coal

The Sonda-Thatta Coal Mine is a coal mine located in Sindh, Pakistan. The mine has coal reserves amounting to 3.7 billion tonnes of coking coal, one of the largest coal reserves in Asia and the world.

== See also ==
- List of mines in Pakistan
