= Salt Range coal mine =

Coal mine in Punjab, Pakistan

Salt Range Coal Mine
- Location: Punjab, Pakistan
- Products: Coking coal

The Salt Range Coal Mine is a coal mine located in Punjab, Pakistan. The mine has coal reserves amounting to 213 million tonnes of coking coal, one of the largest coal reserves in Asia and the world.

== See also ==
- List of mines in Pakistan
