= Khewra mine =

Gypsum mine in Pakistan

- Location: Punjab, Pakistan
- Products: Gypsum

The Khewra mine is one of the largest gypsum mines in Pakistan. The mine is located in Punjab. The mine has reserves amounting to 25 million tonnes.

== See also ==
- List of mines in Pakistan
