= Sonalba coal mine =

Coal mine in Sindh, Pakistan

Sonalba Coal Mine
- Location: Sindh, Pakistan
- Products: Coking coal

The Sonalba Coal Mine is a coal mine located in Sindh. The mine has coal reserves amounting to 2.47 billion tonnes of coking coal, one of the largest coal reserves in Asia and the world.

== See also ==
- List of mines in Pakistan
