= Kişladağ mine =

Gold mine in Turkey

Kışladağ Gold Mine
- Location: Usak Province, Turkey
- Products: Gold
- Opened: 1997
- Closed: 2041
- Company: Eldorado Gold
- Website: www.eldoradogold.com

The Kışladağ mine is the largest gold mine in Turkey. The mine is operated by the Canadian mining company Eldorado Gold. The mine is located in Uşak Province in western Turkey and is an open pit operation that uses heap leaching for gold recovery.
