= Mawand mine =

Gypsum mine in Punjab, Pakistan

- Location: Punjab, Pakistan
- Products: Gypsum

The Mawand mine is one of the largest gypsum mines in Pakistan. The mine is located in Punjab. The mine has reserves amounting to 20 million tonnes of gypsum.

== See also ==
- List of mines in Pakistan
