= Pakistan Chrome Mines Ltd =

Mining company in Balochistan, Pakistan

Pakistan Chrome Mines Ltd. is a mining company that owns and operates Chromite and Magnesite mines in Balochistan Province. It was initially incorporated as Baluchistan Chrome Mines Ltd in 1902 during colonial rule.

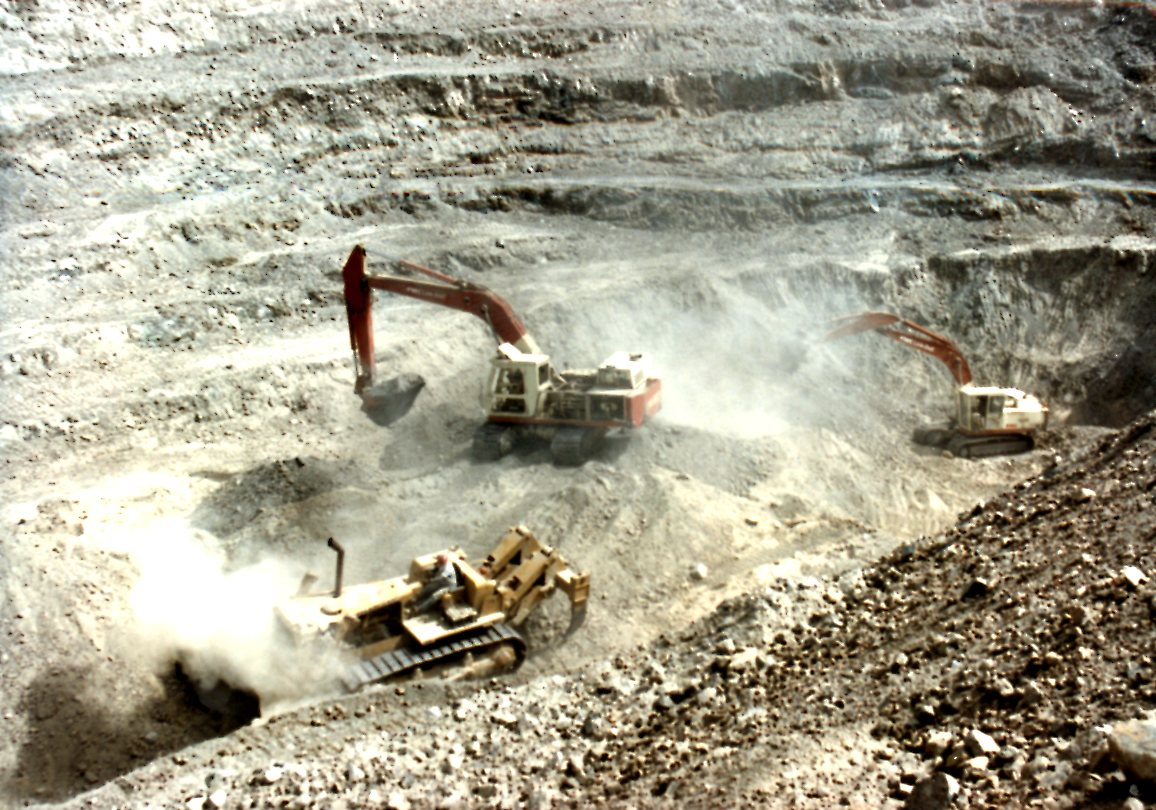
Gowal Open Pit Chrome Mine

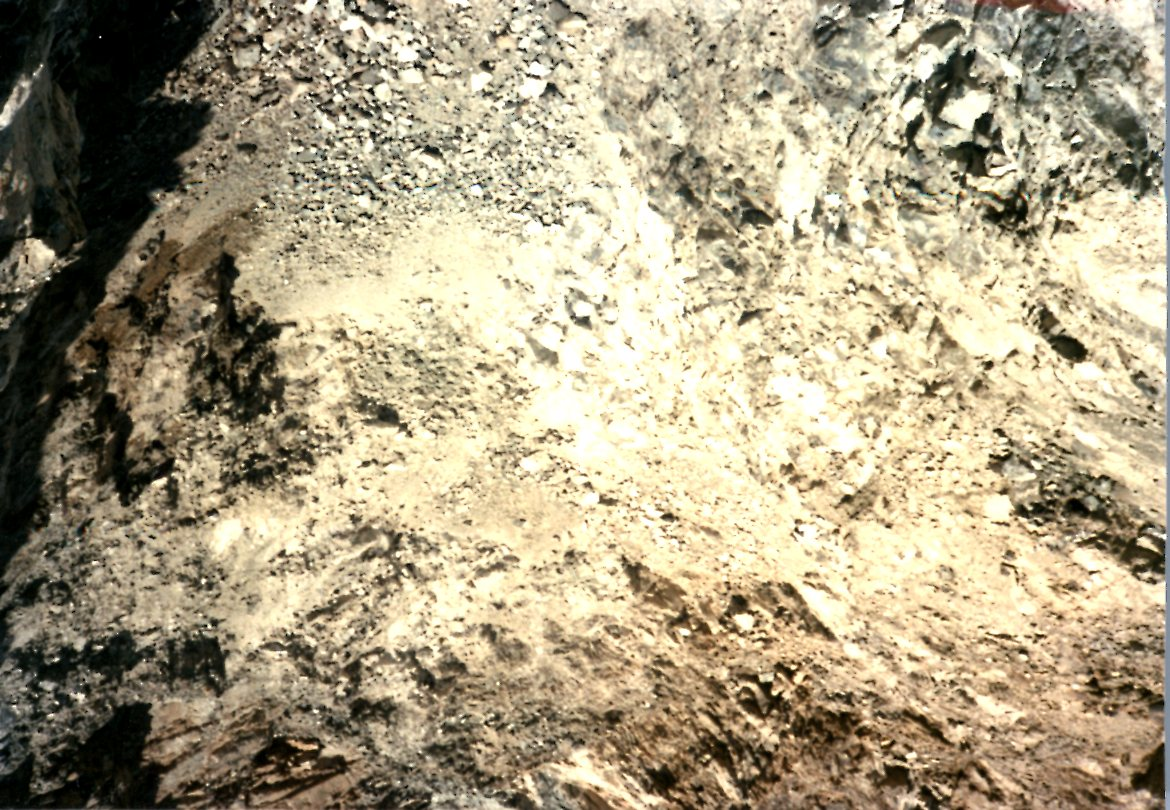
Chrome Deposit Khanozai

The company was owned by Pacific Energy & Mining Co. of Reno, Nevada.

The mines are located in Zhob District in Baluchistan also in shangla district, specifically in Muslimbagh, Khanozai, Nisai and Gwal. Some of the Deposits are located in Southern Baluchistan near Khuzdar.

== Production ==
The leases operated by Pakistan Chrome Mines have produced an accumulated 1.5 million metric tons of High Grade Chromite and smaller quantities of Magnesite Ore.

== Reserves ==
Probable Reserves of Chromite are approximately 4.5 million metric tons.

== Markets ==
Small scale local market exists for chemical grade chromite for use in Chromic Acid and to some extent refractory bricks. Vast majority of chromite ore is exported to the People's Republic of China. Most of it is of metallurgical grade, 46% Cr_{2}O_{3}, with a chrome to iron ratio of 3:1, smaller quantities of Chemical and Refractory Grade ore are produced as well.

Karachi University, Pakistan awards yearly the Pakistan Chrome Mines Gold Medal to the leading student in Geology.

Pakistan Chrome Mines was awarded chromite leases by the Government of Afghanistan in 1975. These leases were never canceled. Due to the war in Afghanistan, Pakistan Chrome Mines has suspended all operations in Afghanistan.

== Gallery ==
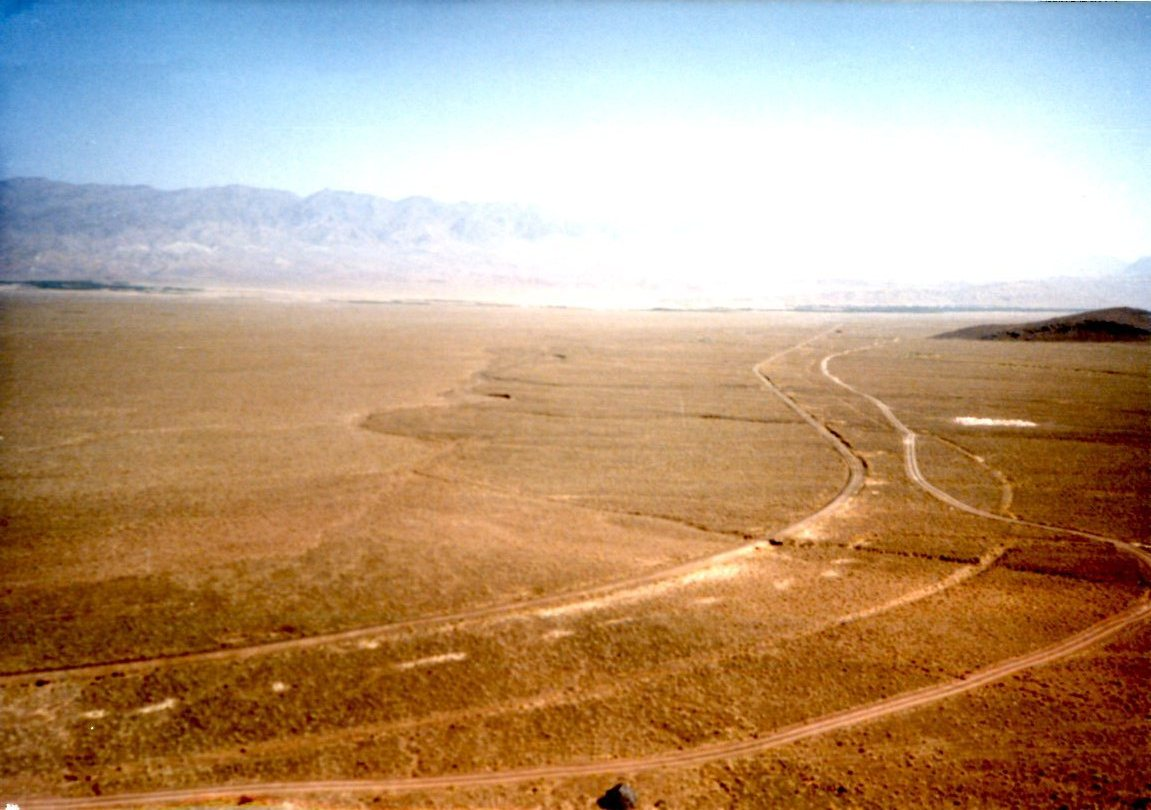
Muslimbah

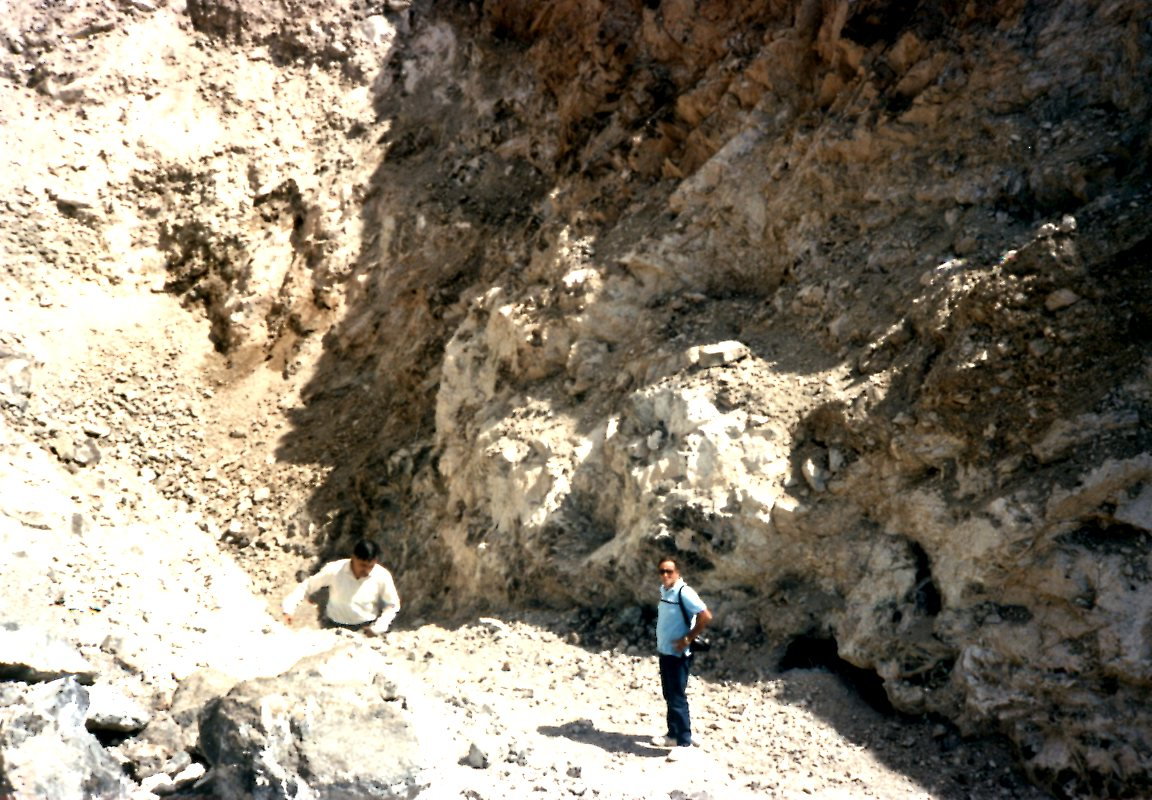
Chromite Deposit

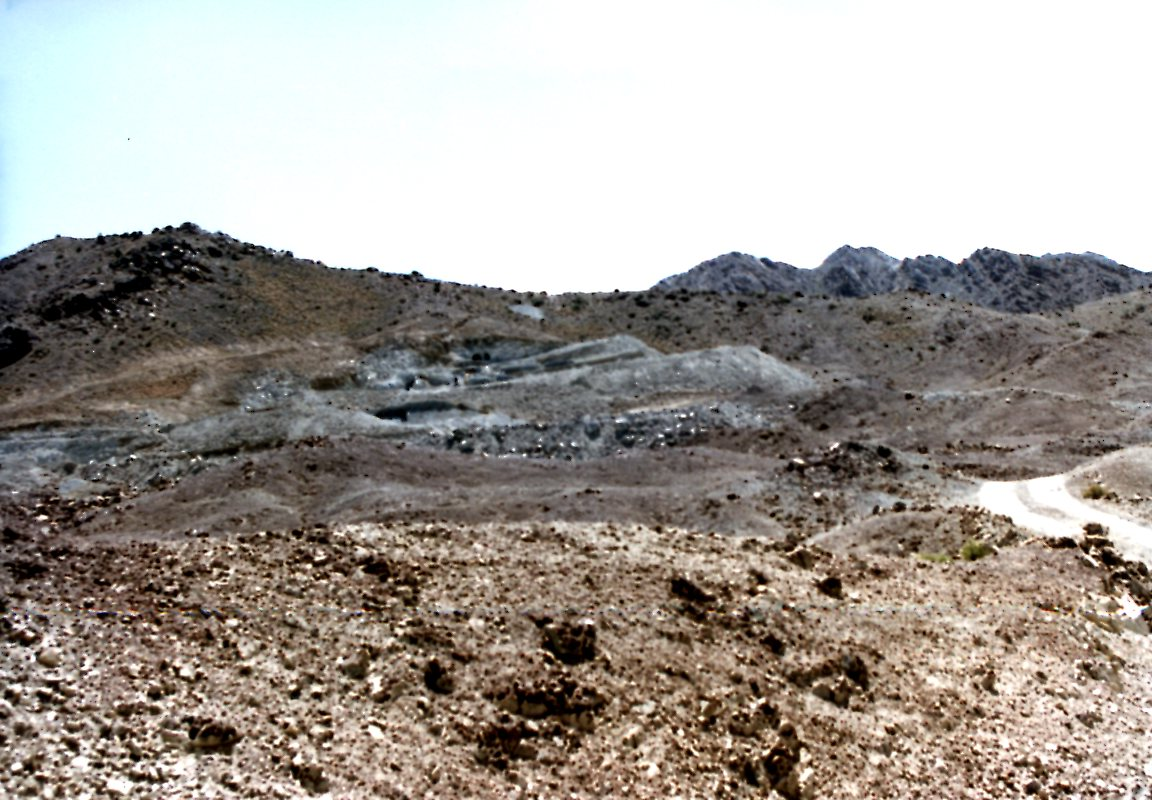
Muslimbagh Deposits

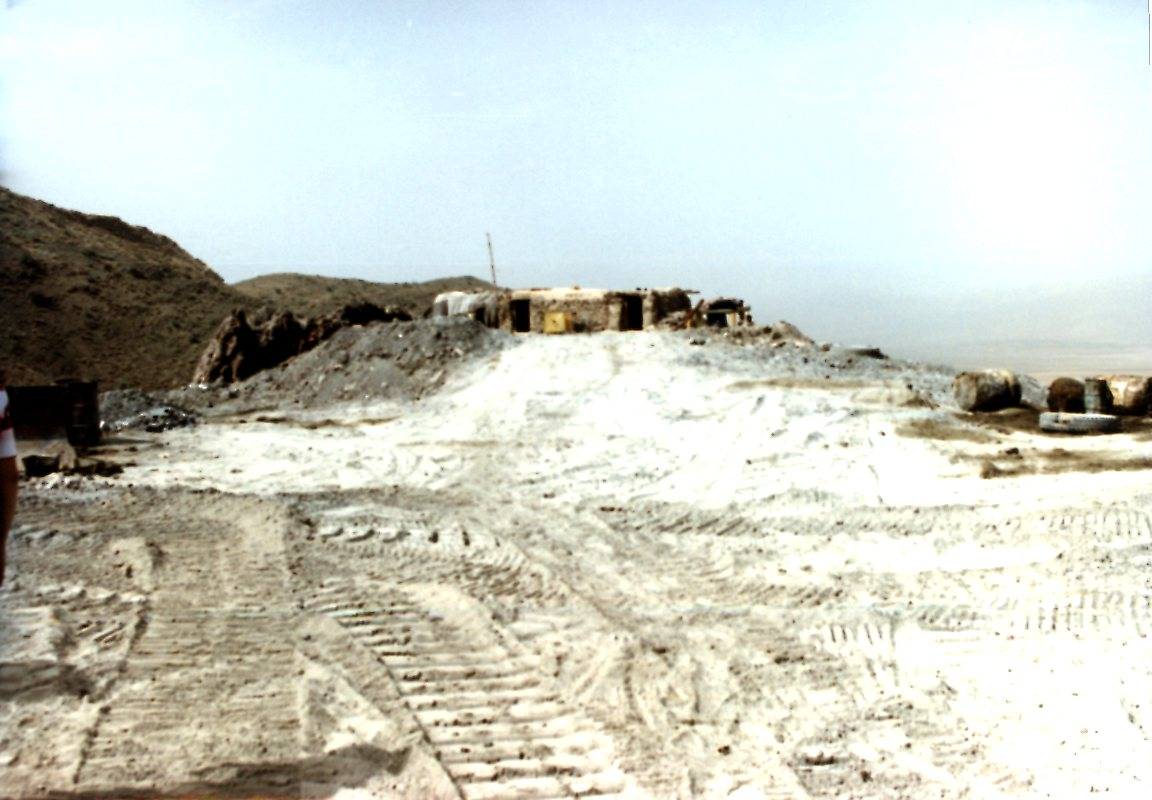
Mine 403

== See also ==
- Pakistan Mineral Development Corporation
- Pakistan Coal Mines and Resources
- USGS report on PCM leases Hindubagh
