= Warcha =

Warcha Warcha Salt Mins
- Village and union council
- Country: Pakistan
- Region: Punjab Province
- District: Khushab District
- Time zone: UTC+5 (PST)

Warcha (Urdu: وڑچهہ) is a village and one of the 51 Union Councils (administrative subdivisions) of Khushab District in the Punjab Province of Pakistan. It is located at 32°24'46N 71°57'57E. The area is home to Warcha salt mine, which has over 1 billion tonnes of salt reserves, where industrial salt mining was launched in 1872.
