= Sino Gold Mining =

Former gold mining company

Sino Gold Limited
- Type: Public
- Traded as: ASX: sgx SEHK: 1862
- Industry: Gold mining
- Founded: 1995 as Sino Mining International Limited
- Defunct: 2009
- Fate: Acquired by Eldorado Gold in 2009
- Successor: Eldorado Gold
- Headquarters: Australia
- Area served: Mainland China
- Key people: Peter Cassidy (Chairman); Jake Klein (CEO)
- Products: Gold
- Owner: Eldorado Gold

Sino Gold Mining Limited or Sino Gold (simplified Chinese: 澳华黄金; traditional Chinese: 澳華黃金; pinyin: àoHuá huángjīn) was a gold mining company headquartered in Sydney and conducting most of their mining operations in Jilin, Heilongjiang, Guizhou, and Shaanxi provinces in the People's Republic of China. In addition to being listed on the Australian Stock Exchange, they completed a listing on the Hong Kong Stock Exchange, with Morgan Stanley appointed as financial advisor early in its history. They were later acquired by Canadian mining group Eldorado Gold in 2009 for US 1.8 billion dollars.

== See also ==
- Gold as an investment
- Gold mining in China
- Jinfeng Gold Mine
