= Certej mine =

Epithermal gold-silver deposit in the Apuseni Mountains of Transylvania

Certej
- Location in Romania

Location
- Location: Certeju de Sus, Hunedoara County, Romania; 45°57′39″N 22°58′47″E

Production
- Production: approx. 140,000 oz Au

History
- Opened: Not currently producing

Owner
- Company: Eldorado Gold Corporation
- Website: www.eldoradogold.com
- Acquired: 2012

The Certej mine is an epithermal gold-silver deposit located in the Apuseni Mountains of Transylvania in western Romania. The deposit extends from surface and was previously mined as an open pit. Certej contains proven and probable reserves of approximately 2.5 million ounces (70.9 tonnes) of gold and 16.3 million ounces (462 tonnes) of silver.

The project is owned by Eldorado Gold, a Canadian gold and base metals producer.

The project involves mining and processing of approximately 3 million tonnes of ore per annum over a mine life of 15 years. The mine is expected to yield approximately 140,000 ounces (3.97 tonnes) of gold and 830,000 ounces (23.5 tonnes) of silver per year in doré, reflecting an average total process recovery of 88% for gold and approximately 80% for silver.

The mine was the site of the 1971 Certej dam failure, which resulted in 89 deaths.
