= European Goldfields =

European Goldfields Ltd.
- Company type: Public
- Traded as: TSX: EGU
- Industry: Mineral exploration, Gold mining
- Founded: 2000
- Fate: Acquired by Eldorado Gold
- Headquarters: Whitehorse, Yukon
- Products: Gold, Silver, Copper, Lead, Zinc
- Number of employees: 244 (Sept 2010)
- Subsidiaries: Hellas Gold (Greece); Deva Gold (Romania)
- Website: www.egoldfields.com

European Goldfields Ltd. was an EU-focused, Whitehorse based Canadian precious metals company engaged in gold, silver and copper exploration, development and production. The mining rights it owned to land in Greece, Romania and Turkey gave it access to over 10 million ounces of 2P gold reserves in addition to over 80 million ounces of silver.

Frank Timiş, the 9th richest Romanian was a major shareholder in the company from 2000 to 2006 (his share ranged from 15% to 18.9%); it was from him that the company acquired 21% of its 95% interest in Hellas Gold. Ellaktor, Greece's biggest construction and civil engineering company, owned 19.36% of European Goldfields and is also the owner of all outstanding shares of Hellas Gold (5%).

In December 2011 Eldorado Gold initiated a $2.5 billion friendly takeover of European Goldfields. The deal came just after Centerra Gold attempted to buy the company and just before European Goldfields was to vote on a $750m (£479m) credit deal offered to it by Qatar Holdings, to finance the Skouries and Olympias gold projects. The acquisition was completed in February 2012.

== Operations ==
European Goldfields had two main subsidiaries, Hellas Gold (Greece) and Certej (Romania).

Turkey - Joint ventured with Ariana Resources, exploration occurred in the area of Ardala.

=== Greece ===
- Stratoni mine - is an underground, silver-lead-zinc mine that uses a multi-stage flotation process to extract a lead-silver concentrate and a zinc concentrate.
- Skouries project - is a high-grade gold-copper porphyry deposit.
- Olympias project - is a pre-existing gold-silver-lead-zinc mine not currently in operation.

=== Romania ===
- Certej Mine (80% owned) - A development project located within Transylvania in the area of the Apuseni Mountains. Operated by subsidiary Deva Gold S.A.. Production last occurred in 2006. There are also 2 major exploration projects near Certej that European Goldfields was involved in.
