= Rakhi-Munh mine =

Gypsum mine in Punjab, Pakistan

- Location: Punjab, Pakistan
- Products: Gypsum

The Rakhi-Munh mine is one of the largest gypsum mines in Pakistan. The mine is in Punjab. The mine has reserves amounting to 27 million tonnes of gypsum.
