= Amuri, Pakistan =

Town in Balochistan, Pakistan

Amuri
- Location within Pakistan
- Coordinates: 29.14°N 63.36°E
- Country: Pakistan
- Province: Balochistan
- Time zone: UTC+5 (PST)

Amuri is a town and union council of Chagai District in the Balochistan province of Pakistan.
