= Bahadur Khel =

Pakistani village

Coordinates: 33°10′57″N 70°57′15″E

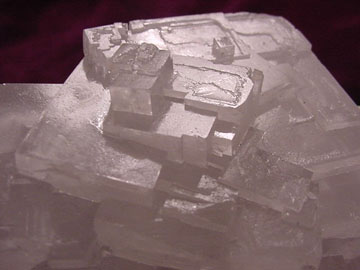
Rock salt crystal

Bahadur Khel is a village and Union Council of Karak District in Khyber Pakhtunkhwa province of Pakistan. It is located at 33°10'57N 70°57'15E with an altitude of 548 metres (1801 feet). The village is the site of an extensive rock salt quarry. The quarry (one mile long by half a mile broad) produces high-quality rock salt suitable for human consumption. The facility is managed by the Pakistan Mineral Development Corporation.

Bahadurkhel Para. Para is a tradition which dates back to earlier inhabitation of the village by the founders, who were all khattaks. Para is primarily a visit or expedition towards the mountains of Manzalai, Tareeqa, and Wanjorae Garhy, which are rich sites for harvesting the local fruit called gurguray (which appears similar to blueberries but is different). The villagers take their food and camping supplies to the mountains, where musical skills, traditional songs and dance are shown in the wild. In total they spend three days in the mountains, and on the last day they arrange a competition of shooting or aiming at targets, where the winners are rewarded.

== History ==
During British rule, the area was part of the old Kohat District, and the facility was under the control of the Northern India Salt Department, a government body of British India.The Khattak tribesmen of this village fought against the British in the years 1850-52

Bahader Khel is a union council which consists of 7 large villages: Bahader Khel, Darish Khel, Ghol Banda, Anar Banda, Shaheedan Banda, Charpara Banda, and Shaheedan. The village of Bahadur Khel is the origin for these smaller villages. These villages are known by the name of Bahadur Khel.
