= Stratoni mine =

Coordinates: 40.5228°N 23.7857°E

- Interactive map of Stratoni mine
- Location: Central Macedonia, Greece
- Products: silver, lead, zinc
- Company: Eldorado Gold

The Stratoni mine is an underground, silver-lead-zinc mine located in the Chalkidiki Peninsula in northern Greece. It uses a multi-stage flotation process to extract a lead-silver concentrate and a zinc concentrate.

The mine is located 3 kilometers from Stratoni, Greece, where the loading and port is located, and 100 kilometers from Thessaloniki.
