= China National Gold Group Corporation =

Chinese state-owned gold mining company

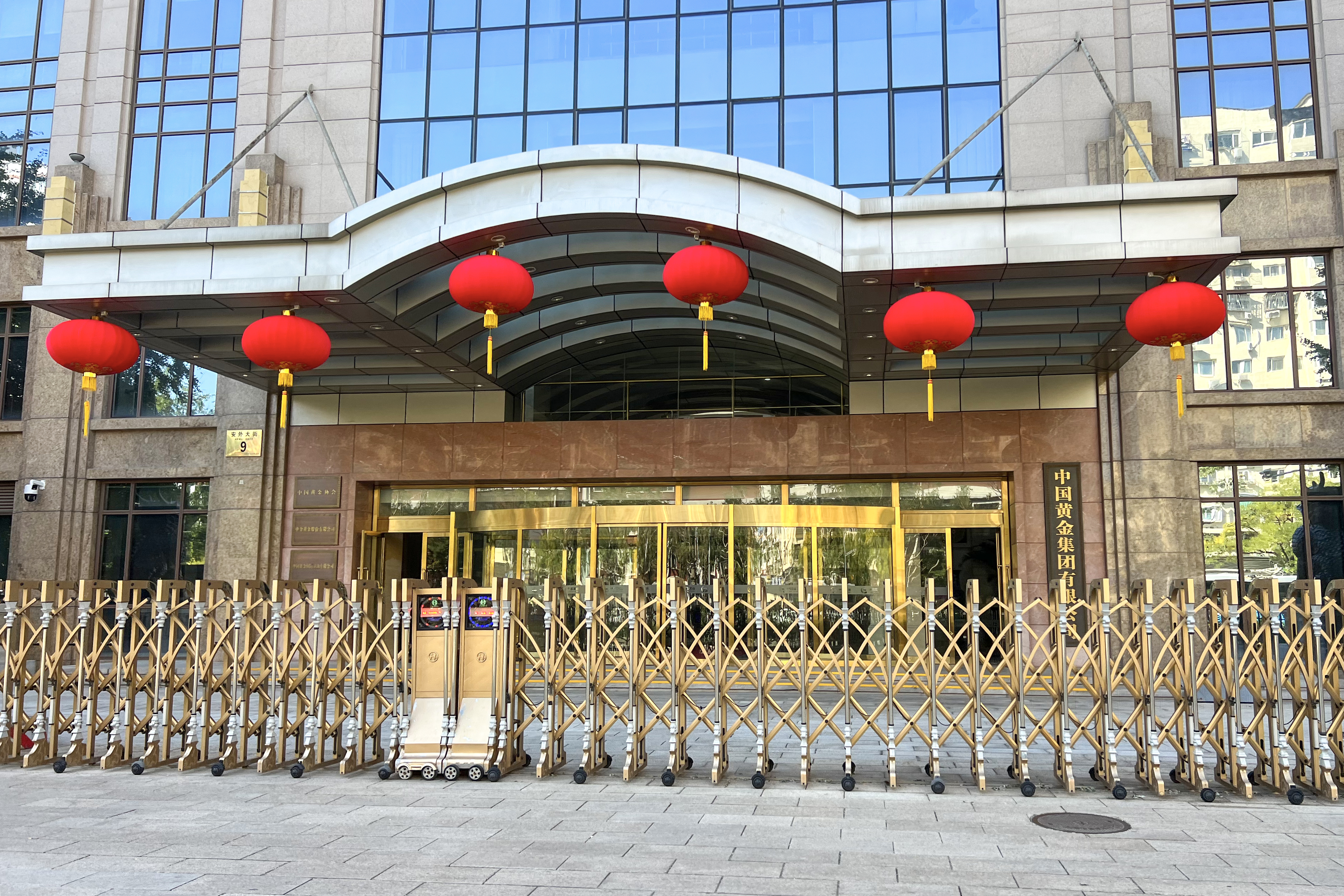
- Entrance to China Gold head office in Dongcheng District, Beijing
- Native name: 中国黄金集团有限公司
- Company type: State-owned enterprise
- Traded as: SEHK: 2099
- Industry: Mining, Retail, Contract Engineering, Irradiation Sterilization
- Founded: 1979
- Headquarters: Beijing, China
- Key people: Lu Jin (Chairman)
- Products: Gold, Copper, Silver, Molybdenum
- Number of employees: 23,092 (2024)
- Website: www.chinagoldgroup.com

China National Gold Group Corporation (CNGC, Chinese: 中国黄金集团有限公司), also known as China Gold, is a centrally-administered state-owned enterprise primarily involved in the exploration, mining, processing, and refining of gold, copper, silver, and molybdenum. It was established in 1979 and operates under the supervision of the State-owned Assets Supervision and Administration Commission (SASAC).

== Mining operations ==
=== Domestic operations ===
CNGC's primary domestic mining assets include:

- Chang Shan Hao (CSH) Gold Mine – Located in Inner Mongolia, this mine is one of China's largest open-pit gold operations, achieving commercial production in July 2008.
- Jiama Copper-Gold Mine – Situated in Tibet Autonomous Region, Jiama is a significant polymetallic deposit, producing copper, gold, molybdenum, silver, lead, and zinc. Phase I production started in 2010, and Phase II began in July 2018. In 2013, a landslide at the site killed 83 workers, prompting environmental and safety reviews.
- Jinfeng Gold Mine – Acquired from Eldorado Gold in 2016 for US$300 million, this mine located in Guizhou Province is one of China’s largest gold producers, combining underground and open-pit operations.

=== International operations ===
CNGC actively pursues overseas resource acquisitions and joint ventures:

- Kulu-Tegerek Copper-Gold Mine – A producing copper-gold mine located in the Kyrgyz Republic’s Chatkal District. It is 84% owned by China National Gold Group Corporation and 16% by China CAMC Engineering (Hong Kong), with the latter acting as EPC contractor. The mine includes both underground operations at the Kulu-Tegerek deposit and placer mining at the Suluu-Tegerek deposit. It was designed to process 1.8 million tonnes of ore annually, producing approximately 11,000 tonnes of copper, 600 kg of gold, and 4.6 tonnes of silver, with projected annual sales of US$100 million. Logistics and equipment delivery are coordinated by China Gold Trading (Shanghai).
- Soremi Copper Mine – In December 2013, CNGC acquired the copper mining subsidiary Soremi in the Republic of Congo from the Gerald Group, forming a joint venture for project development. The mine entered production in 2017 and produces approximately 10,000 tonnes of copper cathode annually.

== Development projects ==
- Kluchevskoye Gold Deposit – China National Gold entered a joint venture with India's Sun Gold to develop the Kluchevskoye gold deposit in Russia's Siberia region. China National Gold acquired a 70% stake in the project, which received Russian parliamentary approval in July 2018. The joint venture was mentioned during the 10th BRICS summit in July 2018 in Johannesburg, South Africa, highlighting the economic cooperation between member states. The project planned a pre-production investment of up to $500 million to develop an open-pit mine with an expected annual production capacity of 6.5 tonnes of gold. The project was mothballed in April 2019, and production has not commenced as of 2026.

== Previous bids and negotiations ==
- In 2010, China Gold was engaged by Hong Kong–listed Jackin International Holdings to manage the assets of Copper Century Corp, a privately held Californian copper, gold, and iron ore miner that Jackin had announced it would acquire for HK$500 million earlier that year. The management contract was terminated before completion of the acquisition following internal board disputes at Jackin over the structure and control of the mining deal.
- In 2012, China Gold attempted to acquire Barrick Gold’s Tanzania operations for approximately $2 billion. According to Chinese sources, the negotiations broke down largely due to a revised Tanzanian capital-gains tax law that took effect during the sale process. Under the new law, the sale of the mines would have been subject to a 20% tax on the total gain, and CNGC demanded that Barrick indemnify them against this potential tax liability. Barrick refused, making the tax issue a key factor in the failure of the bid.
- In 2014, negotiations with Ivanhoe Mines regarding African copper assets ended without agreement. In 2015, Ivanhoe Mines reached a strategic partnership with Zijin Mining, which acquired a 49.5% stake in the Kamoa-Kakula Copper Project in the Democratic Republic of the Congo for US$412 million.

== Other business areas ==
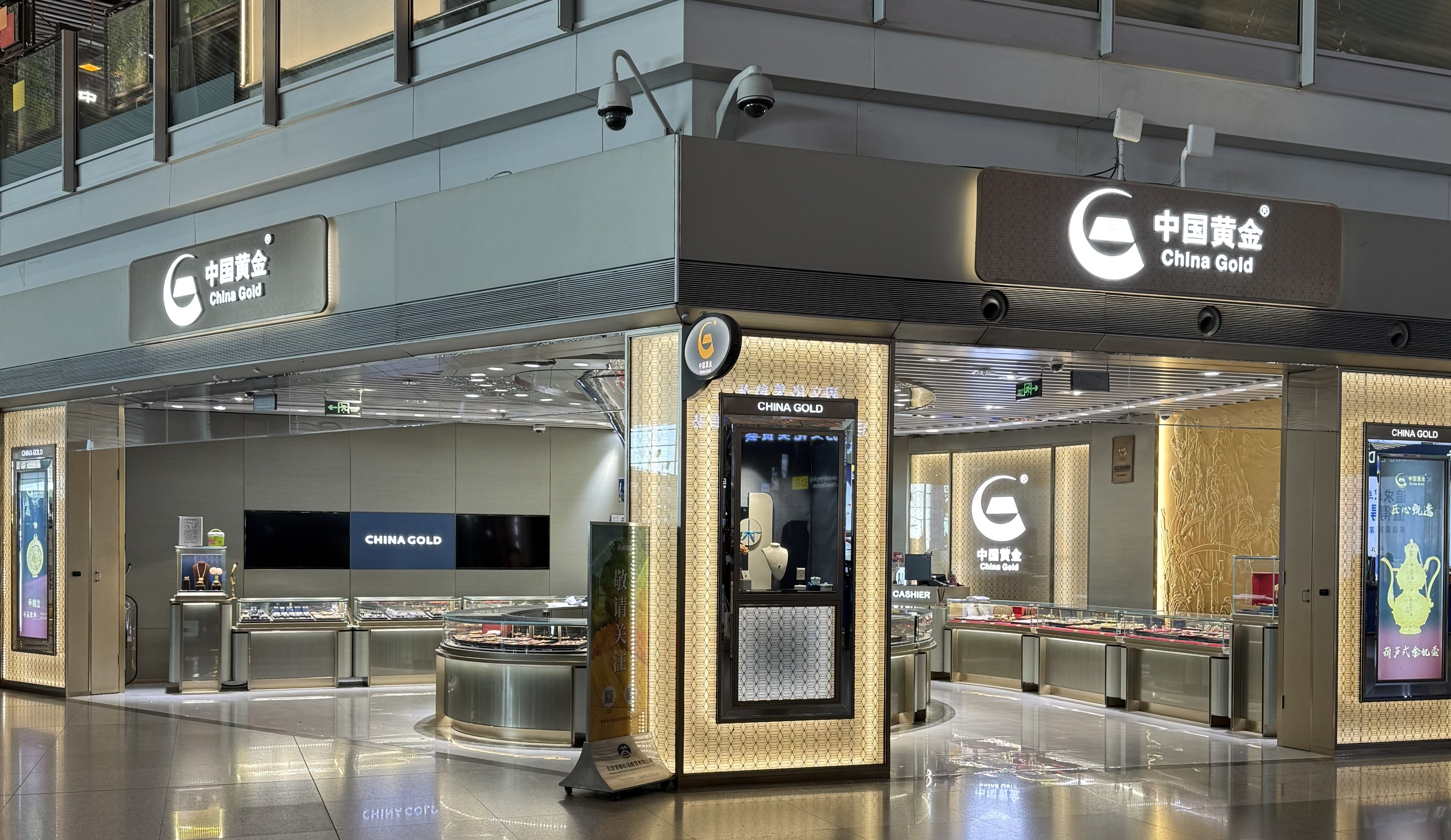
China Gold outlet at Terminal 3 of Beijing Capital International Airport

In addition to mining, CNGC operates businesses in retail gold jewelry, refining, and irradiation sterilization services for food, medical, and cosmetics industries. It also engages in geological exploration, engineering construction, and publishes gold industry news as the official media for the Shanghai Gold Exchange and Shanghai Diamond Exchange.
