= Olympias mine =

- Interactive map of Olympias mine
- Location: Central Macedonia, Greece; 40°35′26″N 23°45′19″E
- Products: Gold, silver, lead, zinc
- Company: Eldorado Gold
- Acquired: 2012

The Olympias mine is a previously producing gold-silver-lead-zinc mine located in the Halkidiki Peninsula in northern Greece. It was on care and maintenance between 1995-2010 and is currently under redevelopment by Eldorado Gold. Production is targeted in Q1 2017.

== Geology ==
Olympias is a gold-rich polymetallic carbonate replacement deposit hosted in strongly deformed metamorphic rocks of the Paleozoic Kerdylia Formation of the Serbo-Macedonian Massif in northeastern Greece. The host rocks consist of biotite gneiss and schist interlayered with marble horizons, irregular pegmatite lenses and aplite. The marble horizons host the ore zones at the Olympias deposit.

== Development Approach ==
Olympias is being re-developed in three phases:

Phase 1 (2013-2016)

Phase 1 includes the refurbishment of the existing processing plant in order to reprocess the previously-mined tailings. Tailings retreatment started in late 2012, produced approximately 20,000 ounces of gold per year and was completed in early 2016. The existing underground infrastructure was also refurbished and extended during this Phase.

Phase 2 (2017-2022)

Phase 2 involves processing ore from the underground through the existing processing plant, reconfigured to produce three concentrates: lead-silver, zinc and gold bearing pyrite-arsenopyrite. Start up is expected in Q1 2017 with production rates of approximately 72,000 ounces of gold and 55,000 ounces of gold equivalent per year.

Phase 3 (~2022-2025)

In Phase 3, production ramps up to an estimated 170,000 ounces of gold and 130,000 ounces of gold equivalent per year on completion of a new processing plant in the adjacent Stratoni Valley.
