= Saindak =

Saindak سیندک
- town
- Location within Pakistan
- Coordinates: 29°16′N 61°34′E
- Country: Pakistan
- Province: Balochistan
- District: Western Chaghi
- City: Nokkundi
- Time zone: UTC+5 (PST)

Saindak (Urdu: سیندک) is a town in Western Chagai, Balochistan, Pakistan. Large deposits of copper and gold have been discovered in Saindak. The Saindak Copper Gold Project has caused economic prosperity in the town. Saindak is the regional headquarters of the Pakistan Frontier Corps.
