= Saindak Copper Gold Mine =

Mine in Pakistan

Saindak Copper-Gold Project
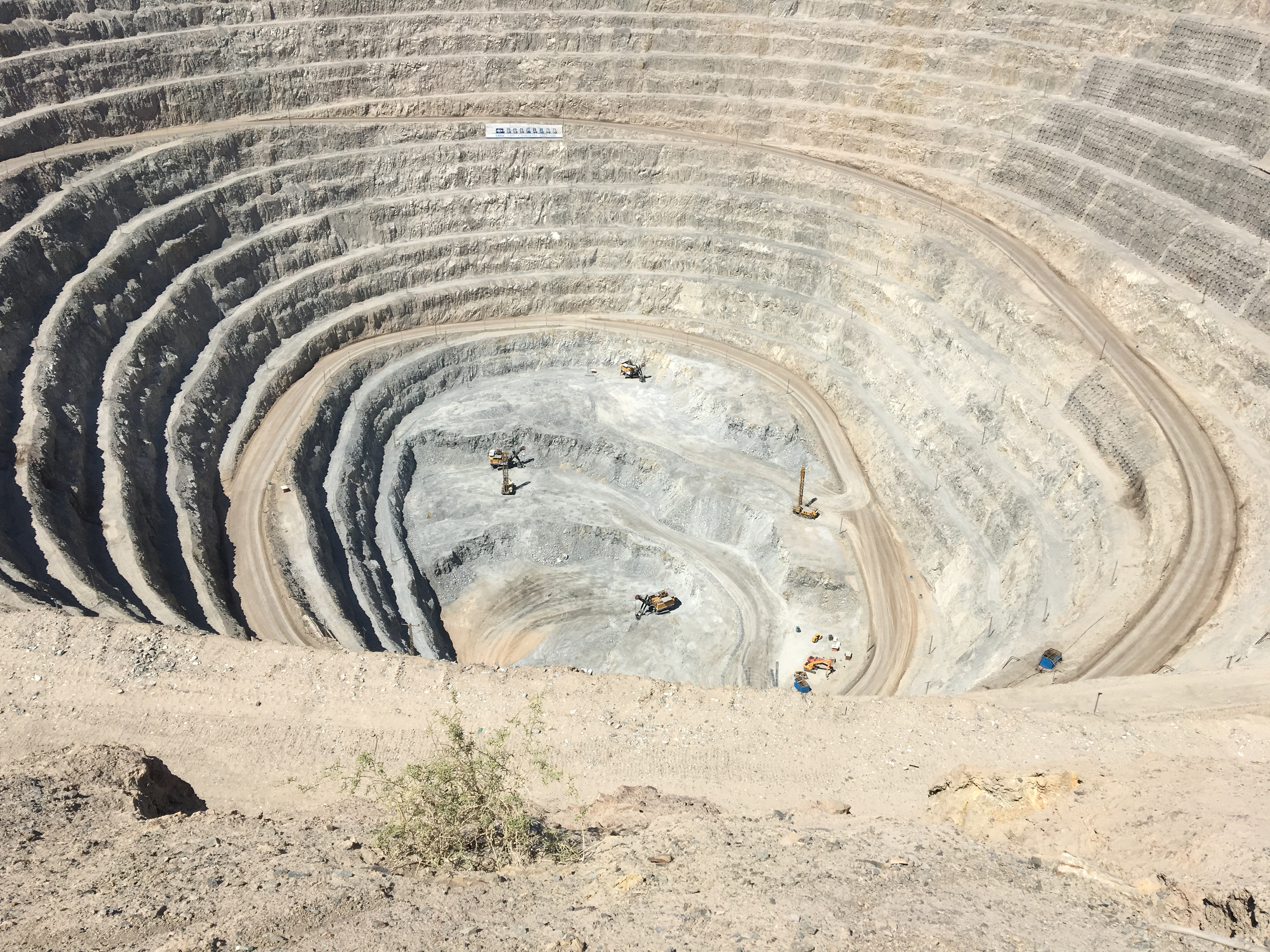
- Hard rock underground copper-gold mine (West Saindak)

- Location within Balochistan, Pakistan Location within Pakistan
- Location: Saindak, Chagai District, Balochistan, Pakistan; 29°14′58″N 61°36′43″E
- Products: Copper, Gold, Silver
- Opened: 1995
- Company: Metallurgical Corporation of China Ltd. Saindak Metals Ltd.

The Saindak Copper-Gold Mine is a copper mining and gold extraction project located near the town of Saindak in Chagai District, Balochistan, Pakistan. The site contains rich deposits of copper, gold, and silver and is operated by the Metallurgical Corporation of China (MCC) under a lease agreement with the Government of Pakistan.

== History ==
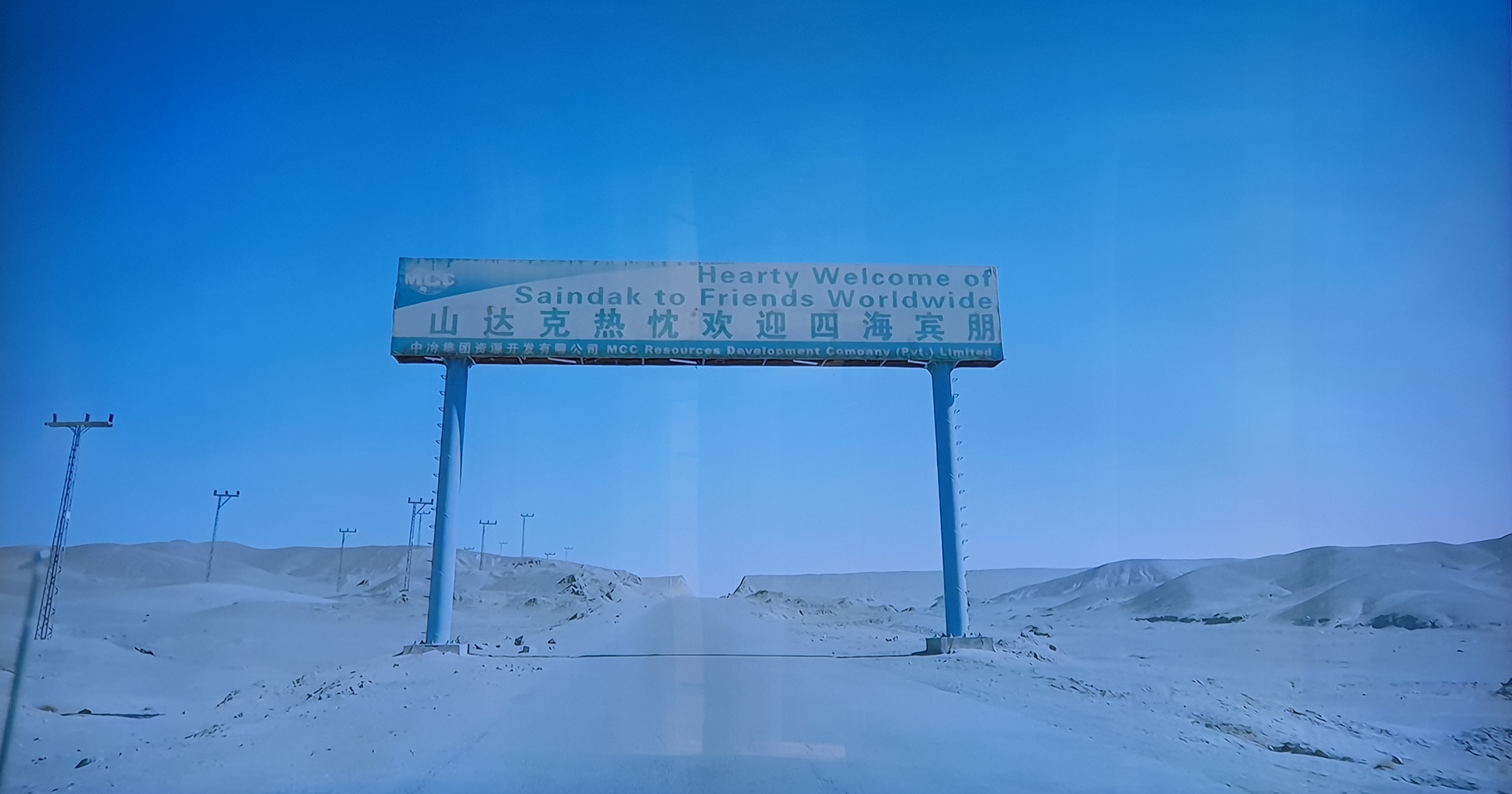
The sign in Chinese and English at the entrance of the Saindak project

The discovery of copper and gold deposits in the Saindak area was made in the 1970s. Trial production began in 1995 following the establishment of the Saindak Copper-Gold Project by Saindak Metals Ltd., a state-owned enterprise, at a cost of PKR 13.5 billion.

Initial trial operations produced approximately 1,700 tonnes of copper, 6,000 ounces of gold, and 12,000 ounces of silver per month. Infrastructure development included a 50 MW power plant funded by aid from Germany and France, as well as a township with amenities such as schools, hospitals, and water supply systems to support over 2,000 residents.

Despite successful trials, the project faced delays due to bureaucratic hurdles and a lack of funding, leading to inactivity for several years. In 2002, a 10-year lease agreement was signed with MCC for the mine's operation. The agreement was later extended by the Federal Cabinet of Pakistan, most recently in 2017, allowing MCC to continue operations until October 2022.

Under the Aghaz-e-Haqooq-e-Balochistan initiative, the federal government agreed to transfer majority ownership of Saindak Metals Ltd. to the provincial government of Balochistan. However, the transfer was stalled due to the federal government's demand for repayment of PKR 29 billion in prior investments. Saindak Metals repaid PKR 6 billion but, due to insufficient funds, offered an additional 20% equity stake to settle the balance, which was rejected by the federal government.

=== Planned Handover ===
The lease held by MCC was set to expire in October 2022, with expectations that operational control of the project would revert to the Government of Pakistan and potentially transition to the Balochistan provincial government. However, citing the lack of technical and financial capacity at the local level, the federal government extended MCC's lease for an additional five years in January 2023, despite opposition from Balochistan's leadership. Negotiations remain ongoing regarding future ownership, profit-sharing arrangements, and a timeline for eventual handover.

== Operations ==
The Saindak project is currently operated by the Metallurgical Corporation of China under a lease agreement. The mining process involves hard-rock underground mining and smelting of copper-gold ore, producing approximately 7.25 tonnes annually.

In January 2024, the ore processing capabilities at the site were expanded and formally inaugurated, signaling continued development of the project and long-term commitment by MCC.

The project also produces significant quantities of gold and silver as byproducts. In addition to the core mining and processing activities, the site includes a metallurgical plant, workshops, water treatment facilities, and a previously functional railway link to Kuh-i-Taftan station. However, satellite imagery suggests the railway has remained unused since at least 2010.
