= Eldorado Gold =

Canadian company that owns and operates gold mines

Eldorado Gold Corporation
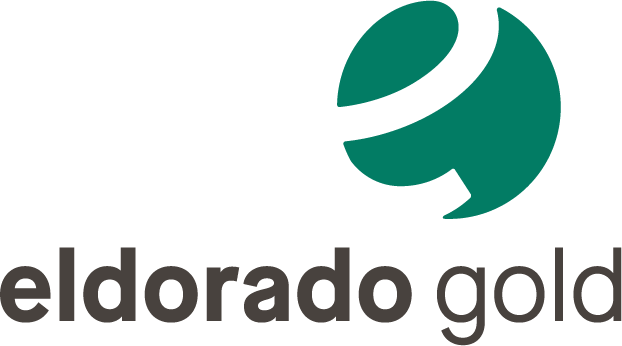
- Type: Public
- Traded as: TSX: ELD; NYSE: EGO
- Industry: Mining
- Founded: April 2, 1992
- Headquarters: Vancouver, British Columbia, Canada
- Key people: Richard Barclay (CEO, 1992-8); Hugh Morris (CEO, 1998-9); Paul Wright (CEO, 1999-2017); George Burns (CEO, 2017-current)
- Products: Gold, Silver, Lead, Zinc
- Revenue: US$617.8 million (2019)
- Net income: US$80.6 million (2019)
- Total assets: US$4.648 billion (2019)
- Total equity: US$4.648 billion (2019)
- Number of employees: 4,300 (end 2018)
- Subsidiaries: Hellas Gold SA (Greece), Tüprag Metal Madencilik Sanayi ve Ticaret AS (Turkey), Integra Gold Corp, Eldorado Gold Cooperatief U.A. (Netherlands)
- Website: eldoradogold.com

Eldorado Gold Corporation is a Canadian company that owns and operates gold mines in Turkey, Greece and Canada. Since its merger with European Goldfields in 2011 the company has been pursuing the development of the Skouries mine, Olympias mine and Stratoni mine in Greece. The company previously developed and operated gold mines in China, Brazil and Mexico. Headquartered in Vancouver and listed on the Toronto and New York Stock Exchanges, Eldorado Gold has developed and operated assets from several merged companies HRC Developments Corporation, Afcan Mining Corporation, Sino Gold Mining, Brazauro Resources, Integra Gold, as well as European Goldfields.

== Corporate history ==
The Eldorado Corporation was incorporated in Bermuda on April 2, 1992, by several entrepreneurs who worked together at Bema Gold. The group had agreed to a contract that would give them a 70% interest in the Mexican La Colorada mining project if they were able to bring the mine into commercial production. In early 1994, La Colorada became Eldorado's first productive mine and by the end of the year they had purchased its remaining interest. Meanwhile, they also fulfilled a similar contract, conducting development-related work in exchange for ownership interest, in the La Trinidad project, also in Mexico. While the mine began production in 1996, and Eldorado gained 100% ownership in 1997, it was shut down and then sold off in 1998 as the price of gold collapsed; La Colorada was sold in 2000 for the same reason.

In April 1996, after fending off a hostile takeover bid by Glamis Gold the previous year, the company was renamed to Eldorado Gold Corporation and had its domicile moved to Vancouver, British Columbia. That year, they acquired the Brazilian São Bento, as well as exploration properties in Brazil and Turkey, from Gencor in exchange for a 43% stake in the company. Gencor made a similar deal with Vancouver Stock Exchange-listed HRC Developments Corporation, 43% of the company for several exploration properties, and then Eldorado and HRC merged to form one company. São Bento would be the company's sole operating mine from 2000 to 2006 as it focused on developing the Kişladağ project in Turkey.

Eldorado Gold increased the gold production from 64,298 ounces in 2005 to 632,539 ounces in 2010, despite the closure of the São Bento in 2007, by bringing Kişladağ into production in 2006, acquiring the Toronto Stock Exchange-listed Afcan Mining Corporation for its Tanjianshan Mine which it had acquired two years previous from Sino Gold Mining, and then acquiring Australian Securities Exchange-listed Sino Gold Mining, in a 2009 $1.6 billion all-stock deal, for their new Jinfeg and White Mountain mines. During this period of growth, Eldorado and Centerra Gold considered merging their operations but were unable to find sufficient advantages. Eldorado went on to be added to the S&P/TSX 60 in 2009 as one of the largest companies listed on the Toronto Stock Exchange.

In 2010 Eldorado acquired, in an all-stock deal worth $122 million, TSX Venture Exchange-listed Brazauro Resources for their share of the Brazilian Tocantinzinho exploration project. Later that year, Eldorado offered a $3.4-billion all-stock deal to acquire ASX-listed Andean Resources for their Cerro Negro project but were out-bid by Goldcorp who offered $3.6-billion in cash and stocks. Instead, Eldorado went on to acquire TSX-listed European Goldfields for $2.5-billion in stocks for its projects in Greece, as well as exploration properties in Romania, such as Certej mine. Eldorado's gold production peaked at 789,224 ounces in 2014 from its three mines in China, the Kişladağ mine in Turkey, supplemented by its second Turkish mine (Efemcukuru) which came online in 2012 and the old Olympias mine in Greece which the company was able to begin retreatment of leftover tailings.

Eldorado Gold began a years long decline as it committed to selling its mines in China in favour of developing its properties in Greece. At the time, during its economic crisis, Greece was actively seeking foreign investment and its Skouries project had the potential to be a high producing, long-lived (over 20 years) gold and copper mine. Other companies had previously attempted to develop the Skouries mine but the government had deemed it as not being in the national interest but the need for foreign investment reversed that decision. However, Eldorado's projects in the Chalkidiki region had long been controversial as other mining projects left locals with little confidence in the government's ability to effectively regulate mining and manage economic development. The company spent US$1 billion by 2017, mostly on the Skouries project, without completing a mine and experiencing protests against the project, due to land clearing in a popular forest and anticipated impacts to environmental values, tourism and agriculture, as well as protests in favour citing the number of jobs the mining project represented. Eldorado Gold's assets in China were sold to China National Gold Group Corporation and the Shenzhen-listed Yintai Resources Company for a cumulative US$900-million in 2016 resulting in its gold production falling to 292,971 ounces in 2017. Despite having gained the Lamaque mine in Quebec with the company's $590 million cash and stock acquisition of TSX Venture-listed Integra Gold, the company suspended dividend payments in 2018 and their stock briefly fell under CDA$1, all while company was accused of using Dutch subsidiaries for tax avoidance purposes and excessively compensating executive management for poor performance.

== Operations ==
As of 2020, Eldorado Gold operates 5 mines:

- Kişladağ gold mine, located in Uşak, Turkey, has been the company's highest producing mine since its opening in 2006. The property was acquired by Eldorado with its 1996 merger with HRC Development and developed as a low-grade open pit mine with heap leaching to produce gold dore.
- Efemçukuru mine, located in İzmir, Turkey, near the village of Efemçukuru, reached commercial production in 2012. It is an underground mine targeting a high-grade deposit whose ore is sold to third parties for processing elsewhere.
- Lamaque mine, located in Val-d’Or, Quebec, Canada, is an underground gold mine that reached commercial production on March 31, 2019.
- Olympias mine, located in the Chalkidiki region of Greece, is an underground gold-silver-lead-zinc mine that ships ore concentrates from port facilities in Thessaloniki and Stratoni for processing elsewhere. It was acquired in Eldorado's business combination with European Goldfields in 2012 and reached commercial production in 2017.
- Stratoni mine, located in the Chalkidiki region of Greece, near Stratoni, is an underground silver-lead-zinc mine that ships ore concentrates from port facilities in Stratoni for processing elsewhere.

=== Past operations ===
- La Colorada, located in Sonora, Mexico, was Eldorado Gold's original mine. It began production in 1994 but was sold in 2000 to a private Mexican company.
- La Trinidad, located in Sinaloa, Mexico, was brought into production by Eldorado in 1996 but was sold in 1998.
- São Bento, located in Minas Gerais, Brazil, was purchased from Gencor in 1996 and operated through to 2006.
- Tanjianshan, located in a mountainous desert in Qinghai, China, the open gold pit mine was brought into production in 2007, following Eldorado's acquisition of the Afcan Mining Corporation. The high-altitude mine produced approximately 110,000 ounces annually of gold dore until 2016 when it was sold.
- Jinfeg, located in Guizhou, China, the mine was a combined open pit and underground operation targeting a deep deposit. It was acquired by Eldorado with its 2009 acquisition of Sino Gold. The mine produced between 110,000 and 180,000 ounces of gold dore each year until 2016 when it was sold.
- White Mountain, located in Jilin, China, near the city of Baishan. The underground mine was acquired by Eldorado in 2009 shortly after its opening. The mine produced between 60,000 and 85,000 ounces of gold dore each year until 2016 when it was sold.
- Vila Nova iron ore mine, located in Amapá, Brazil, operated from 2011 to 2014 and has since been on care and maintenance.

== Environmental Impact ==
=== Greece ===
The mining operation at Olympiada has been found to be in violation of Greek environmental protection laws by an inspection committee of the Greek Ministry of the Environment and Energy. The inspectors discovered, among other violations, concentrations over the allowed limits of cadmium, lead and arsenic in a water stream used by the mining operation.

== Documentaries ==
- ELDORADO - The Struggle for Skouries
