= Reko Diq =

Pakistani town

- Town
- Location within Balochistan, Pakistan Location within Pakistan
- Coordinates: 29°06′3.02″N 62°06′20.10″E
- Country: Pakistan
- Province: Balochistan
- Tehsil: Western Chaghi

Government
  - Type: Town
- Time zone: UTC+5 (PKT)

Reko Diq (Balochi: ریکوڈک; Urdu: ریکوڈک), is a small town in Western Chagai District, Balochistan. It is located in a desert area, 70 kilometres (43 mi) north-west of Naukundi, close to Pakistan's border with Iran and Afghanistan. The area is located in the Tethyan belt, which stretches all the way from Turkey and Iran into Pakistan.

Reko Diq is a remote location in the north-west of Western Chagai district. Chagai is a sparsely populated western desert district of Balochistan. It is mostly low relief and thinly populated desert. The weather of Chagai ranges from very hot summers of 40–50 °C (104–122 °F) to very cool winters down to −10 °C (14 °F), with less than 40 mm (1.6 in) of precipitation (winter rain and minor snow). It also exhibits periods of high wind and dust- and sandstorms, which have a demobilising impact on the local activities and trade. Access to the Chagai district is via the Zahidan–Quetta highway, also known as the London Road.

According to the 1998 census the population of Chagai District was 202,562, along with approximately 53,000 Afghan refugees. The population of Chagai District was estimated to be over 250,000 in 2005. Over 50% of the people of the area are Muslims.

Reko Diq, which means 'sandy peak' in Baluchi language, is also the name of an ancient volcano.

The Reko Diq Mine is famous because of its vast gold and copper reserves; it is believed to have the world's fifth-largest gold deposit. According to Samar Mubarakmand, the Geological Survey of Pakistan discovered the Reko Diq reserves in 1978.

== See also ==
- Reko Diq Mine
