= Skouries mine =

Mine in Chalkidiki, Greece

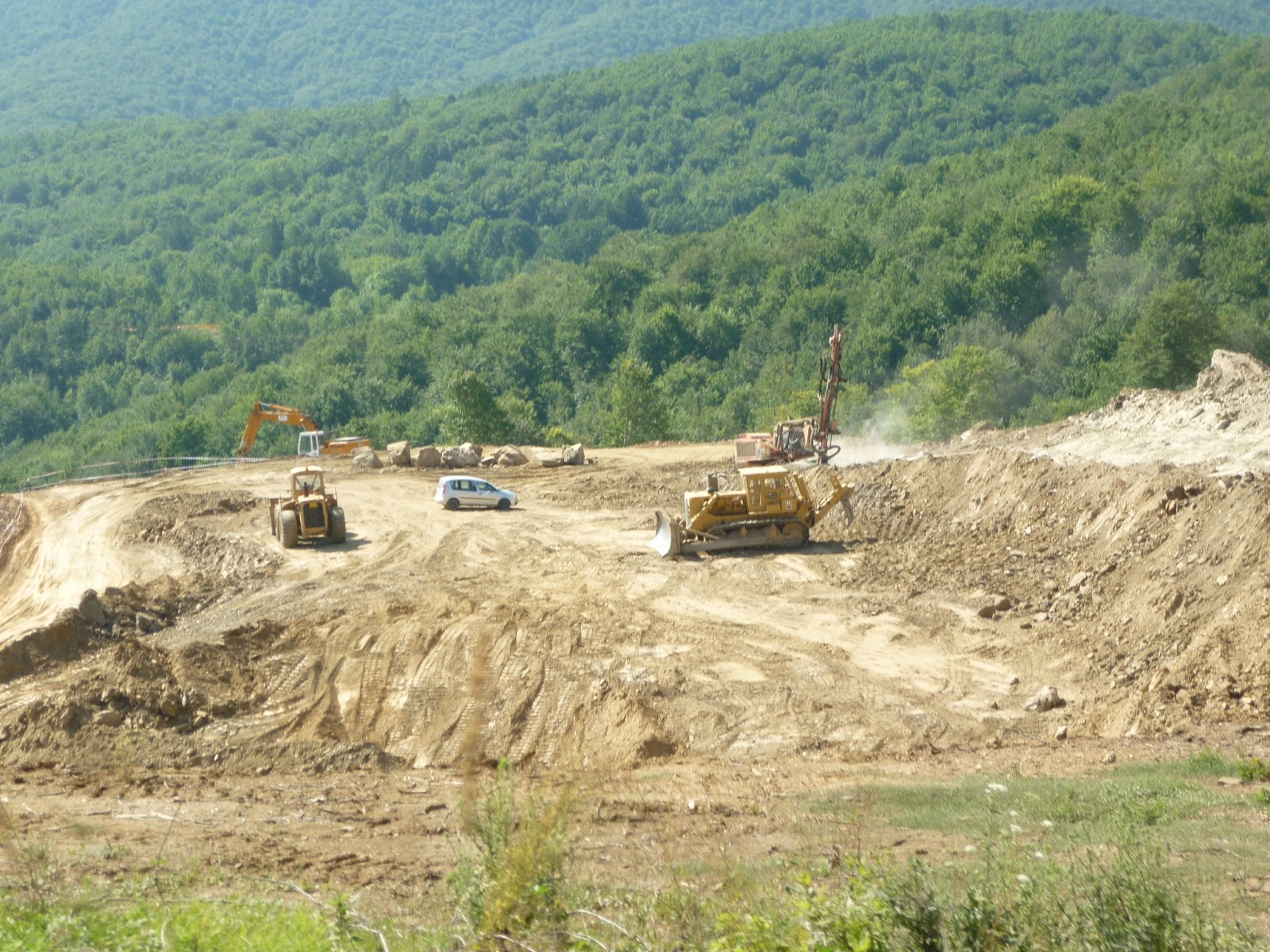
- Interactive map of Skouries mine
- Location: Central Macedonia, Greece; 40°28′36.6″N 23°42′21.4″E
- Products: Gold, Copper
- Company: Eldorado Gold
- Acquired: 2012

The Skouries mine is a high-grade gold-copper porphyry deposit located in the Chalkidiki peninsula in northern Greece. It is currently under development by Eldorado Gold and is planned to be an open pit and underground mine. Production is targeted in 2026.

== Geology ==
Skouries is a gold-copper porphyry deposit centred on a small, pencil-porphyry stock that intruded schist and gneiss of the Paleozoic Vertiskos Formation of the Serbo-Macedonian Massif in northeastern Greece. The porphyry is characterized by at least four intrusive phases that are of monzonite to syenite composition, but contain an intense potassic alteration and related stockwork veining that overprints the original protolith. The host porphyry and potassic alteration at Skouries were coeval and formed during the Early Miocene.

== Development approach ==
Skouries is being developed in two phases:

Phase 1 (2019-2027)

Phase 1 includes a combination of open pit and underground mining for 9 years, producing a total of 1.4 million ounces of gold and 620 million pounds of copper. Ore will be fed to the site's process plant where the ore and a gold and copper concentrate will be produced.

Phase 2 (2028-2042)

Phase 2 involves underground mining for 15 years once Phase 1 is complete. Total production during Phase 2 is expected to be 1.7 million ounces of gold and 850 million pounds of copper.

== Permitting ==
The Skouries project is permitted under the same Environmental Impact Study (EIS) as the Olympias and Stratoni assets. The EIS was approved by the Greek Government in 2011. This environmental permit was challenged but was upheld by the Council of State, Greece's highest administrative court, in 2012 citing Eldorado's "investment was particularly advantageous for the national economy".

Other permitting and licensing delays have also hampered the development of Skouries.

- March 2015 - The Syriza government suspends the application for the building enclosure permit at Skouries from the approval process.
- August 2015 - The Greek Ministry of Environment and Energy suspends technical studies pertaining to Skouries and Olympias. The Greek Council of State issues injunction relief in favour of Eldorado Gold in October 2015 overturning the suspension of the Technical Studies for Olympias and Skouries.
- February 2016 - The Building Permit for Skouries processing plant is received based on a Council of State ruling.
- November 2017: Skouries project suspended due to delays in receiving environmental permits.
- September 2019: Permits for installation of mechanical and electrical equipment in the Skouries mine (and an installation permit for Olympias mine) were provided by the Greek Ministry of Energy and Environment.
- April 2023: Approval of environmental terms for the exploitation of the Kassandra Mines.

== Opposition to development ==
The majority of the local population has opposed the project, citing tremendous environmental impact, resulting to the complete desecration of tourism and agriculture in the area (those industries make up almost all financial activity in the area). The local population demonstrated over the years, even shutting down national roads, but the construction is still going on.
