= Pakistan Mineral Development Corporation =

Mining company in Pakistan

- Company type: State-owned enterprise
- Industry: Mining
- Founded: 1974
- Area served: Pakistan
- Products: Coal, Gypsum, Rock salt, Soapstone
- Owner: Government of Pakistan
- Parent: Ministry of Energy (Petroleum Division)
- Website: Official Website

The Pakistan Mineral Development Corporation (PMDC) (Urdu: ہیَت پاکستان برائے معدنی ترقی) is a semi-autonomous corporation attached to the Ministry of Petroleum and Natural Resources, of the Government of Pakistan. It was created in 1973 with an authorized capital of Rs.1,000 million (approximately 10 million U.S. dollars) to expand and help mineral development activities in the country.

PMDC headquarters are in Islamabad. The company operates salt mine/quarries, coal mines and a silica sand quarry. This company conducts exploration of mineral deposits and prepares technical and economic feasibility reports. When needed and appropriate, it goes ahead and actually mines and markets the minerals in Pakistan.

== Recent developments ==
In October 2021, the Imran Khan government announced plans to take "radical and innovative measures for uplift of the minerals sector with coordinated efforts of all stakeholders including provincial authorities". A senior Pakistani government official said, "The country is blessed with 92 minerals, out of which 50 are exploited on commercial basis. The new initiatives will greatly help exploit true potential of this sector".

This official also announced that the federal government had already established the 'Balochistan Minerals Exploration Company Limited' (BMEC) as a joint venture with the Government of Balochistan (Pakistan) to promote mining in the mineral rich province of Balochistan.

Additionally, a restructuring of Geological Survey of Pakistan (GSP) was underway for better service to help explore more mineral resources in Pakistan.

== See also ==
- Pakistan Coal Mines and Resources
- Pakistan Chrome Mines Ltd
- Resource Development Corporation
- Gemstones of Pakistan
