= Chagai District =

Coordinates: 29°00′N 64°00′E

Chagai District ضلع چاغی چاگۓ دمگ
- District of Balochistan
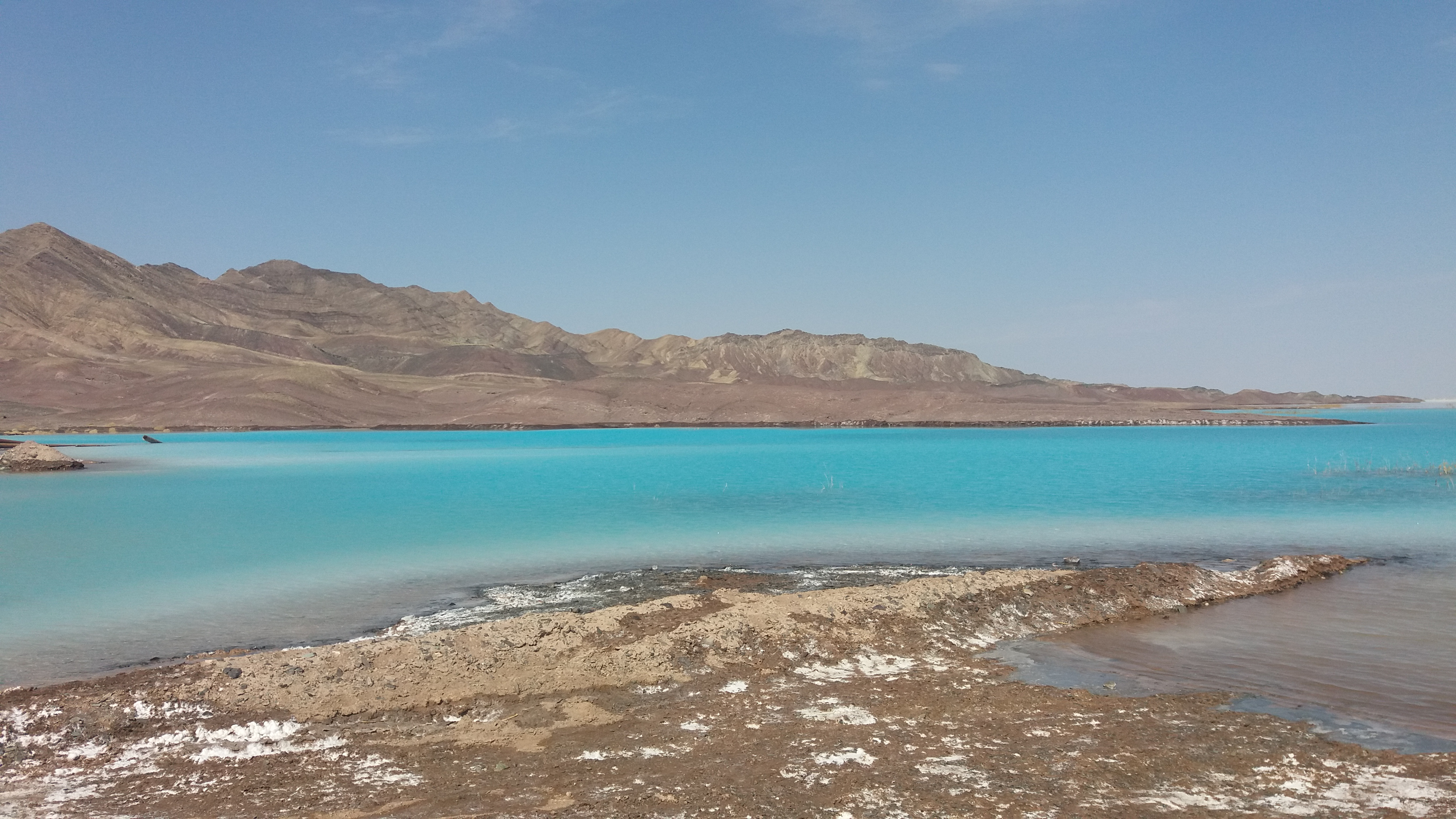
- Saindak Lake

- Map of Balochistan with Chagai District highlighted
- Country: Pakistan
- Province: Balochistan
- Division: Rakhshan
- Established: 1896
- Headquarters: Dalbandin

Government
  - Type: District Administration
  - Deputy Commissioner: Atiq Shahwani
  - District Police Officer: Abdul Aziz Jakhrani (PSP)
  - District Health Officer: N/A

Area
  - District of Balochistan: 19,338 km^{2} (7,466 sq mi)

Population (2023)
  - District of Balochistan: 205,192
  - Density: 10.611/km^{2} (27.482/sq mi)
  - Urban: 20,054
  - Rural: 249,138

Literacy
  - Literacy rate: Total: (33.15%); Male: (41.90%); Female: (23.57%)
- Time zone: UTC+5 (PST)

Chaghi District (Balochi: چاگۓ دمگ; Urdu: ضلع چاغی), also known as Chaghi District, is the largest district of Pakistan by area, located in the northwestern corner of the Balochistan province of Pakistan. The district shares its border with two countries: Afghanistan and Iran.

== Tehsils of Chagai District ==
With its headquarters at Dalbandin, Chagai District retains the following central and eastern tehsils:

- Dalbandin Tehsil
- Chagai Tehsil
- Amuri Tehsil
- Chilgazi Tehsil
- Dak Tehsil

== Demographics ==
Historical population
Year	Pop.	±% p.a.
1951	32,807	—
1961	21,414	−4.18%
1972	34,034	+4.30%
1981	63,713	+7.22%
1998	104,534	+2.96%
2017	226,517	+4.15%
2023	269,192	+2.92%

=== Population ===
As of the 2023 census, Chagai district has 38,213 households and a population of 269,192. The district has a sex ratio of 108.24 males to 100 females and a literacy rate of 33.15%: 41.90% for males and 23.57% for females respectively. 101,423 (37.76% of the surveyed population) are under 10 years of age. 20,054 (7.45%) live in urban areas.

=== Religion ===
In 2023, Islam was the most followed religion with 99.3% followers. Christians and Hindus form small minority.

Religious groups in Chagai District (British Baluchistan era)
Religious group	1901		1911		1921		1931		1941	
Religious group	Pop.	%	Pop.	%	Pop.	%	Pop.	%	Pop.	%
Islam	15,358	97.89%	15,916	97.38%	19,094	89.46%	22,769	93.99%	27,864	95.26%
Hinduism	329	2.1%	385	2.36%	1,931	9.05%	1,313	5.42%	1,204	4.12%
Sikhism	1	0.01%	34	0.21%	265	1.24%	117	0.48%	181	0.62%
Christianity	1	0.01%	9	0.06%	45	0.21%	25	0.1%	1	0%
Jainism	0	0%	0	0%	8	0.04%	0	0%	0	0%
Zoroastrianism	0	0%	0	0%	0	0%	0	0%	0	0%
Judaism	0	0%	0	0%	0	0%	0	0%	0	0%
Buddhism	—N/a	—N/a	0	0%	0	0%	0	0%	0	0%
Tribal	—N/a	—N/a	—N/a	—N/a	—N/a	—N/a	0	0%	0	0%
Others	0	0%	0	0%	0	0%	0	0%	0	0%
Total population	15,689	100%	16,344	100%	21,343	100%	24,224	100%	29,250	100%
Note: British Baluchistan era district borders are not an exact match in the present-day due to various bifurcations to district borders — which since created new districts — throughout the region during the post-independence era that have taken into account population increases.

=== Language ===
Languages of Chagai district (2023)
1. Balochi (73.8%)
2. Brahui (16.8%)
3. Pashto (8.93%)
4. Others (0.51%)

At the time of the 2023 census, 73.77% of the population spoke Balochi, 16.79% Brahui and 8.93% Pashto as their first language.

== Administration ==
Chagai District is administratively subdivided into the following Tehsils and union councils:

Tehsil	Area (km²)	Pop. (2023)	Density (ppl/km²) (2023)	Literacy rate (2023)	Union Councils
Dalbandin Tehsil	7,791	122,918	15.78	39.10%	
Chagai Tehsil	3,975	73,482	18.49	23.77%	
Amuri Tehsil					
Chilgazi tehsil	...	...	...	...	
Yak Machh	7,572	22,908	3.03	24.36%	

== Education ==
According to Pakistan District Education Rankings, a report by Alif Ailaan, Chaghai is ranked at number 91 nationally, with an education score of 52.06. The learning score is 55.58 and gender parity is 60.11.

The national rank according to readiness is 91, with a readiness score of 55.58 and gender parity of 60.11. The school infrastructure rank of District Chaghai is 114 nationally, with a severe shortage of electricity with a score of 4.55 and building condition score of 12.27. Lack of schools for girls is the main issue of the region.

== Notable people ==
- [ Late Mir Muhammad Ibrahim Reki],

Former Senator, Federal Minister for fisheries, federal minister labor, federal minister agriculture.

- [ Mir Pervez Reki ]

Former: President mines & minerals Pakistan. Notable Business figure of Balochistan

- [ @Mir Zulfiqar Reki]

Promoter of health and sports Pakistan. Welfare worker.

- [ Late Haji Azad Khan Barech]

Head of barech tribe in the district, humanitarian and social welfare reformist.

- Sadiq Sanjrani, former chairman of the Senate of Pakistan
- Mir Amanullah Notezai, former member of the Provincial Assembly of Balochistan
- Mir Muhammad Arif Mohammad Hassani, former provincial minister of Balochistan for communication and works
- Sardar Muhammad Umar Gorgaij, senator and former member of the National Assembly of Pakistan
- Sardar Fateh Mohammad Hassani, member of the Senate of Pakistan

== See also ==
- Chagai-I
- Chagai-II
- Chagai Hills
- Saindak Copper Gold Project
- Reko Diq Mine
- Koh-i-Sultan

== Bibliography ==
- 1998 District census report of Chagai. Census publication. Vol. 38. Islamabad: Population Census Organization, Statistics Division, Government of Pakistan. 1999.
