= Coal mining in Pakistan =

Pakistan has coal deposits in Sindh, Punjab and Baluchistan provinces. The total coal resources there are reported to be approximately 185 billion tonnes.

Coal resources of Pakistan
Region	Coal (billion tonnes)
Sindh: Lakhra, Sonda, Thatta, Jherruck, Thar, Haji Coal and others	184.623
Punjab: Eastern Salt Range, Central Salt Range, Makerwal	0.235
Balochistan: Khost-Sharig-Harnai, Sor Range/Degari, Duki, Mach- Kingri, Musakhel Abegum, Pir Ismail Ziarat, Chamalong	0.217
KPK:	0.092
AJK:	0.009
Grand total	185.175

== Regions ==
=== Duki ===
Duki is in Balochistan. It is rich with high-quality coal with the highest rate of extraction in Pakistan. Coal is the main business in the area. More than 80% of the local population are directly involved in the coal business. The coal business is entirely in private hands, although only individuals and not companies are the owners.

Almost all Pushtun tribes in Duki including Nasar, Tareen and Luni participate. The Nasar tribe has a large share, and is considered to be the master miners and businessmen.

In the Duki district coal is mainly under the control of the mine owners, the Petti Tekadars, and the coal agents. The mine owners are either land owners or hold extraction rights. Ownership is held by only a few families, mainly the sardars of different tribes. Petti Tekkadars do not own mines, rather they license them from the owners. Many Petti Tekaddars work in Dukki Tehsil. Coal agents help transport coal to other cities by becoming middlemen. At least 3,000 metric tons of coal are transported to Punjab province. The coal is mainly used in brick kilns and other factories such as textile and cement. The width of the coal seams vary from 6 inches to 9 feet.

On average 1000 coal mines operate with turnover of Rs.50 million daily.

Duki is the best private mining valley in Pakistan. More than 50% of the labor is from Afghanistan.

=== Khora ===
Kingri sub-Tehsil of Musakhel District is located on the borders of Punjab Province. In the early 1980s coal exploration started, but ended due to poor roads. In President Musharraf's regime, the roads from Fort Minro to Kingri were improved. The area hosts two streams, one from Chamalang and one from Duki. The coal-bearing areas are supportive of mining. Fifty plus mines are now operating there. Aram in Kingri has excellent coal and charcoal reserves, available at a depth of 30 feet. The specifications of Kingri coal areas:

Contents	Value
Moisture	3.67
Volatile Matter	38.05
Ash	9.1
Fixed Carbon	54.32
Total Sulfur	5.98
Calorific Value LB	13221

=== Thar ===
Pakistan's largest coal reserves are found in Sindh, measuring approximately 175 billion tonnes. Tharparkar division of Sindh is said to host huge deposits.

== See also ==
- Pakistan Chrome Mines Ltd
- Ghani Mines Pvt Ltd
- Karak, Pakistan
- Reko Diq
- Baghalchur
- Salt Range
- Loralai
- Khewra Salt Mines
- Atomic City of Pakistan
- Coal in Duki, Pakistan
