= Sangi (cloth) =

Kind of silk mixed cloth from India

Sangi was a kind of silk produced in Hindustan. It was a mixed woven cloth, a common cloth in the nineteenth century. The fabric was constructed with a cotton warp and a silk weft, or vice versa.

== Name ==
Sangi is derived from the word sang, which means (together) two warp yarns woven as one.

== Khajari ( ==
Sangi was classified as a silk fabric; it was similar to Mashru but of a lesser quality. All three, Sangi, Mashru, and Gulbadan, have a wavy pattern running along their width. In Sanghi, the peculiar khanjari (Chevron, often relating to V-shaped) pattern is obtained by the arrangements of the dyed yarns in the warp, unlike in Mashru, where the effect is a result of dyeing the warp portions. The striped (wavy yarn) appears as a stitch in Sangi. In contrast, Gulbadan had an expensive, close, and fine texture. Sangi's distinguishing trait was a green or yellow warp (and, as a result, green and yellow khanjari) with a red weft. Although Muslims of the upper classes preferred cotton mixed, it was widely used by all classes.

"Katan," a term for a warp yarn consisting of two loosely twisted yarns, was used to create the Sanghi, Mashru, and Gulbadan silk fabrics.

== Use ==
Several varieties of Sanghi, with varying yarn compositions and dimensions, were created in Jalaun, Allahabad, and Azamgarh. Warp coarse and fine weft Sangi was traditionally worn by Hindu women for Lehnga and by Muslim women for Paijama.

== See also ==
- Daryayi
- Ghalta
