= Callawapore =

Type of calico manufactured in Madras

Callawapore (also spelled Calliapur or Calliapoor) was a type of calico produced in the early nineteenth century in the region surrounding Madras (now Chennai), India. Contemporary commercial dictionaries describe it as a blue and white cotton cloth, woven as part of the broader category of Madras piece goods exported by the East India Company. Piece goods of various qualities and dimensions were produced in and around Madras. Callawapore was one of the materials exported to England in the nineteenth century. These textiles were manufactured in a variety of qualities and dimensions and were shipped to British markets through the port of Madras.

Madras was a major center of textile production during this period, supplying numerous varieties of printed and woven cottons to European buyers. Callawapore was listed among the standard export fabrics alongside other regional cottons such as salempores, guinea cloths, and pullicats. British commercial manuals noted that these goods were produced in significant quantities and formed part of the regular trade between southern India and England in the early nineteenth century.

Although Callawapore appears frequently in early nineteenth‑century trade dictionaries, the term fell out of use later in the century as textile terminology shifted and industrially produced British cottons displaced many traditional Indian export fabrics.

== See also ==
- Punjum
- Salampore
