= Garbi cloth =

19th century silk-cotton blend fabric

Garbi also Garvi was a silk-cotton blend fabric made with cotton in the warp and silk in the weft. It was a handloom textile material from the nineteenth century Sindh and Punjab. Garbi had a strong and a rough texture. It was made of thirty yards in length and nine inches in width, like the other piece goods from India and Pakistan. Women in Sindh wore Garbi-made folk dresses.

== See also ==
- Mashru
