= Piece goods =

Textile materials sold in cut pieces

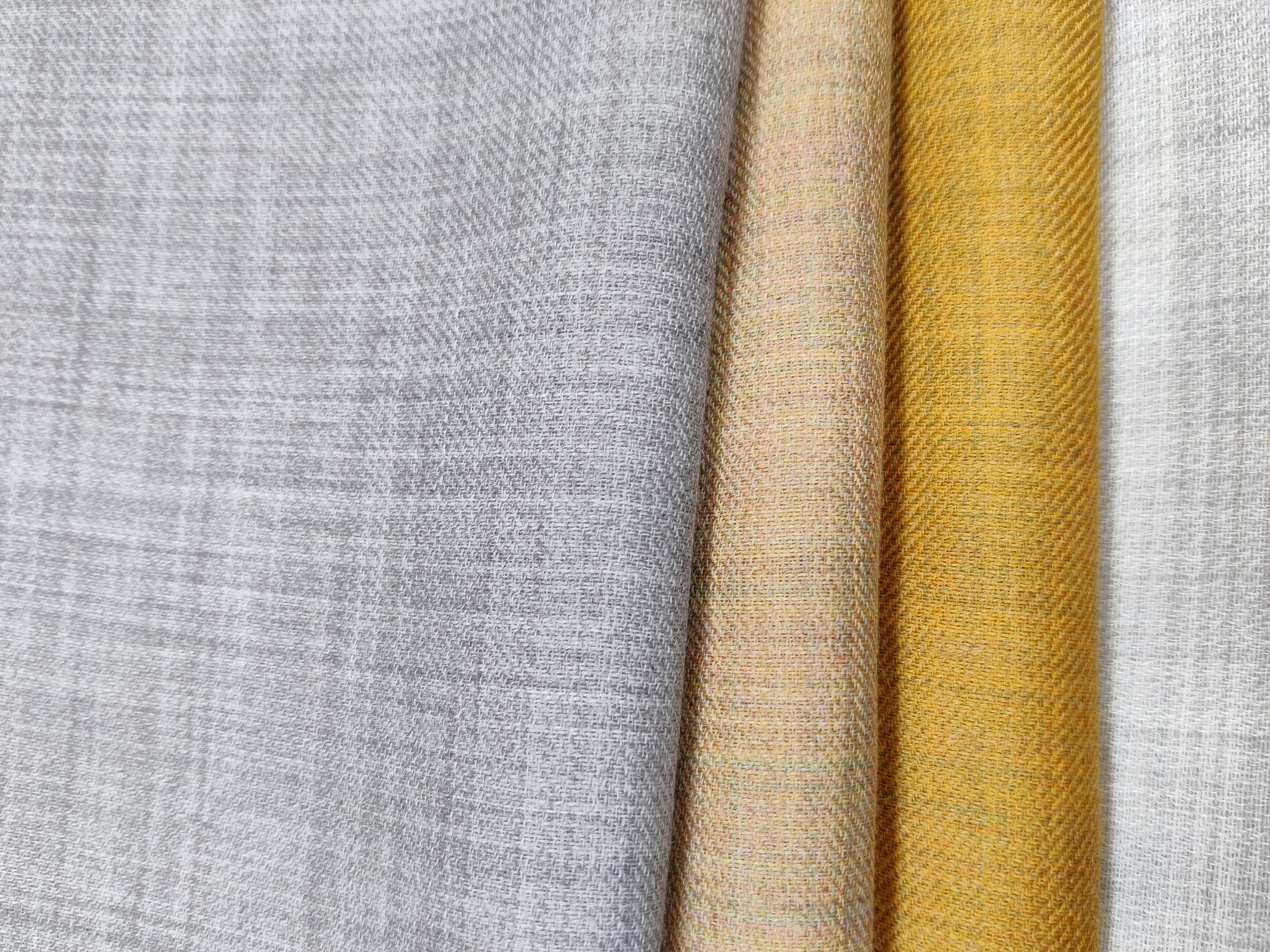
Woollen piece goods

Piece goods are textile materials sold in cut pieces as per a buyer's specification.

Historically, piece goods were either cut from a fabric roll or produced with a certain length, also called "yard goods". Various textiles such as cotton, wool, silk, etc., were traded in terms of piece goods. The prices were determined as per the fabric quality.

John Forbes Watson classified Indian textiles into two types: piece goods and loom goods. Piece goods are materials that must be cut and sewn before they can be used, whereas loom goods, such as scarves and saris, are ready to use after leaving the loom.

== Production ==
Many Indian clothes were ready to wear after leaving the loom. These were simple pieces of cloth of dimensions suited to the purposes. Lungi, Dhoti, and Sari are few specific examples of drape clothes. Other cloths produced according to specified dimensions are:

- Longcloth made at Coromandel Coast was of the length of 37 yards or 37 to 40 yards.
- Qutni at Damascus was woven as per market specified dimensions; for example, Length 6.13 meters width 0.7 meters was for Syria, Baghdad and Constantinople, Smyrna, and Persia. But for Egypt, the length was slightly more, i.e., 6.83 with the same width.
- Chautar an old muslin has been recorded with specific dimensions, i.e., length 12.44 meters and width 77.75 centimeters. Chautar was compared with sansuo, which was a three shuttle cloth, type of fine cotton variety produced at Songjiang.
- Tasar, a silk and cotton cloth used for lining in quilts from Bengal was produced with 14 yards of length and 1.5 yards width.
- Alachas were 5 yards long.
- A type of Gulbadan (silk cloth), Sohren Gulbadan was with 36 feet long and 1 foot and 4 inches wide.
- Salampore was 16x1 yards.
- Sussi (cloth) a striped fabric was 10 to 20 yards long and one yard in wide.
- Khasas had dimensions of 20x1 or 1.5 yards. The number of threads in warp direction were 1400–2800 with the weight of 595 grams /pc (with 2800 threads).
- Mulboos khas special muslins, reserved for royal aristocracy were measured 10 yards x 1 yard when produced of half-length. They had 1800-1900 threads in warp.
- Man-cheti was a "ginger yellow" cotton cloth made in India in the 14th century. Made in lengths of fifty feet and a width of four feet.
- Punjum, a kind of longcloth from the Northern Circars was produced in a variety of thread counts. As per John Forbes Watson, a common piece of Punjum weighs 14 pounds and is 18 yards long (36 Cubits). Its width ranges from 38 to 44 inches.
- Ghalta had a standard length of 9 yards and a width of 26 inches.
- Kente cloth from Ghana, which dates back to the ninth century, consists of narrowly woven strips that are sewn together.

== Trading practices ==
Textile piece goods have been sold globally in many varieties, including grey, bleached, or dyed and printed and the practice is still being followed by many buyers. The knitted fabric is traded by weight also.

=== History ===
Historically drapers and cloth merchants were trading in piece goods. India was famous for its handloom cotton piece goods. Many fabrics of coarse to fine cotton qualities such as Baftas, calicos, and muslins were exported during the Mughal era.

There are records stating that in 1664 the East India Company imported 273,746 pieces of cotton cloth from India (approximately 4.2 million sq. meters). This increasing trend finally peaked in 1684 at 1,760,315 pieces (or 26.9 million sq. meters). Woolen and silk piece goods were also traded. Woollen piece goods for example shawls were exported from Kashmir.

The exports were continued until the British cloths emerged in the 19th century. Substantial quantities of various piece goods were exported from Madras in 18th and 19th century. Punjum cloths accounted for a sizable portion of Madras' exports in the 18th century. Punjum, Salampores, Palampores, Chintz, Book muslin and Longcloth, varieties of Ghingahm were among the piece goods which were exported to America from Madras.

During the 1920s, the Philippines was the largest market for cotton piece goods exported by the United States of America.

=== Current practice ===
Several textile piece goods are still traded with different HS codes to differentiate the weave, structure, and composition. For example, HS code 51123030 stands for hundred percent wool, and 58109100 is for woven dyed cotton with embroidery piece goods. The Harmonized System, or HS, is an identification code developed by the World Customs Organization (WCO).

== See also ==
- Mercery
- Bolt (cloth)
- Greige goods
- Drapery
