= Alamode (disambiguation) =

Alamode may refer to

- Alamode, A 17th century silk material, used in England and France
- Alamode, Missouri
- Alamode Island
- à la mode
- À la mode (EP)
