= Team jersey =

Identifying shirt worn as part of a sports uniform

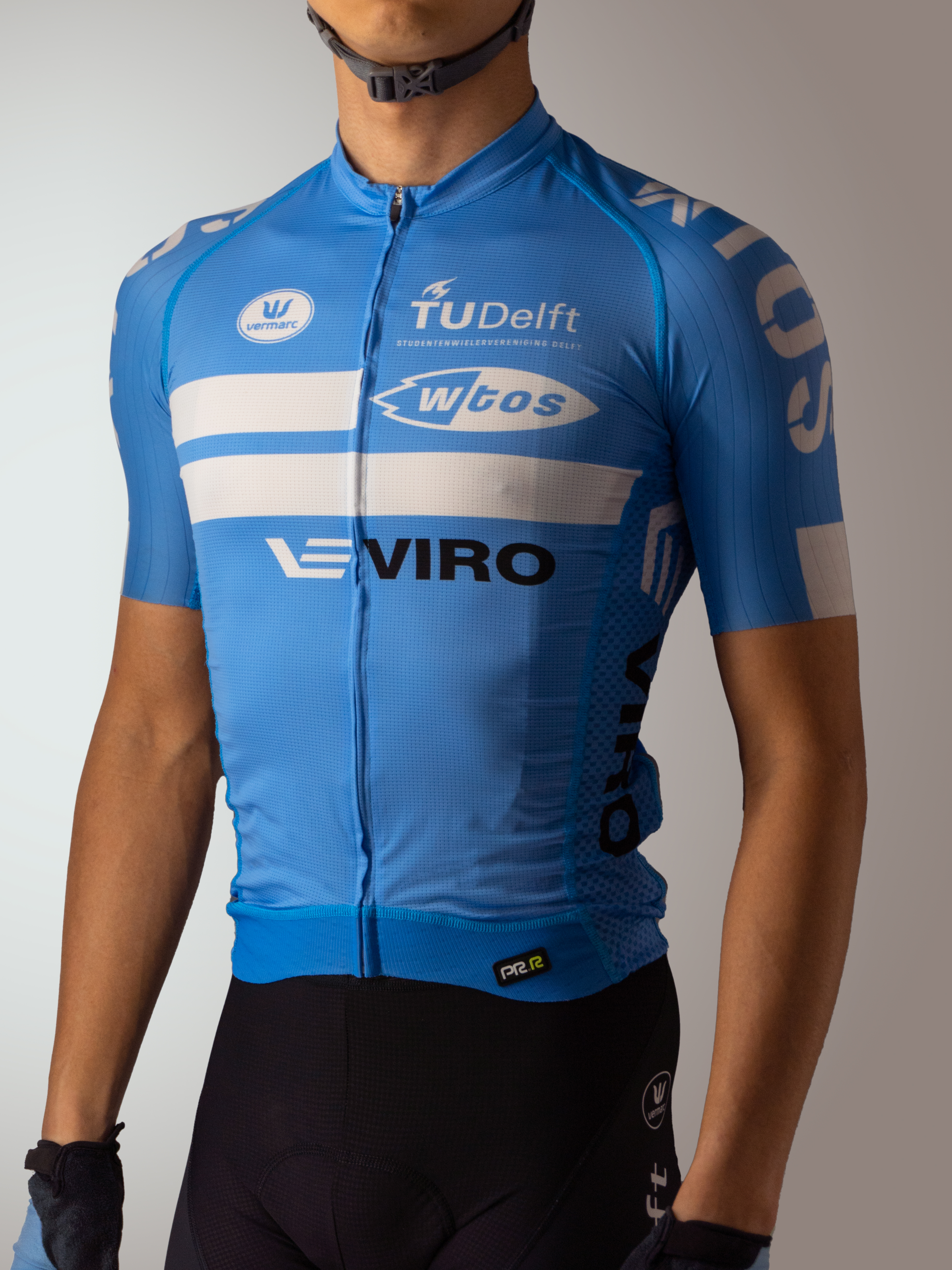
A modern summer, tight-fitting cycling jersey

A team jersey (also sports jersey) is a shirt worn by members of a sports team to identify their affiliation with the team. Jerseys display their wearers' names and/or numbers, and generally show the colours and logo of the team. Numbers are frequently used to identify individual players, since uniforms give players a similar appearance. A jersey may also carry the logo of the team's sponsor.

Jerseys are typically made from knitted fabrics, whose loop structure gives the stretch and recovery needed for athletic movement. Modern sports fabrics are often engineered for moisture transport, breathability and thermal regulation.

The history of team jerseys reflects the evolution of sportswear from simple identification garments into modern performance apparel. Over time, jerseys have become important symbols of team identity, culture, sponsorship, and fan support, combining functional design with visual representation of sporting organisations.

== Examples ==
=== Cycling jersey ===
A cycling jersey is a specialised garment designed for road cycling. These jerseys are usually made from lightweight synthetic microfibre materials that wick moisture from the skin to aid evaporation, keeping the rider cool and dry. Key features include a zippered front, an elastic waistband, and rear pockets.

In the Tour de France, jerseys are awarded to the leaders of specific classifications after each stage:

- Yellow jersey (maillot jaune): worn by the rider with the lowest cumulative time (general classification leader)
- Green jersey (maillot vert): worn by the leader of the points classification, scored across sprints and stage finishes
- Polka dot jersey (maillot à pois rouges): worn by the leader of the mountains classification
- White jersey (maillot blanc): worn by the leading rider in the young rider classification

=== Hockey jersey ===
The main garment of an ice hockey uniform, traditionally called a sweater, is known as a hockey jersey.

=== Basketball and baseball jerseys ===
Basketball jerseys are usually sleeveless. Baseball jerseys are usually button-up.

=== Guernsey ===
In Australian rules football, the player's shirt is known as a "guernsey".

=== Other ===
Other examples include cricket whites, the basketball uniform, the baseball uniform and the gridiron football uniform.

== See also ==
- Kit (association football)
- Kit (cycling)
- Kit (rugby football)
- Away colours
- Third jersey
