= Mashru =

Woven cloth, blend of silk and cotton

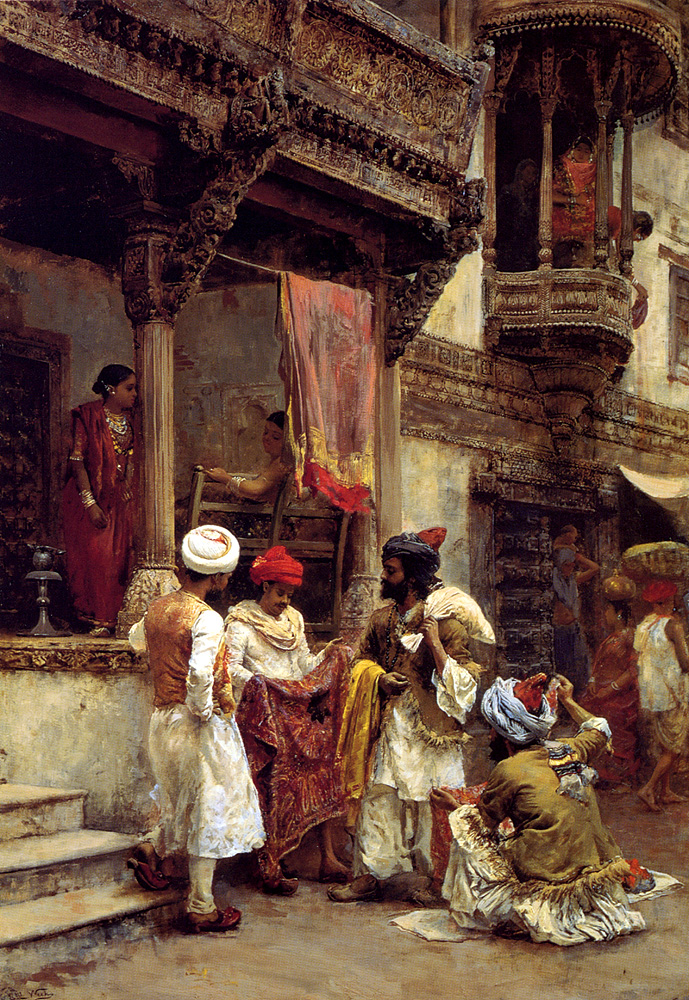
Silk merchants in the 19th century

Mashru (also historically spelled mashroo, misru, mushroo or mushru) is a woven cloth that was historically a blend of silk and cotton. It was historically a hand-woven satin silk fabric variety found in the Indian subcontinent, and its proper use is described in the 16th-century Ain-i-Akbari.

== History ==
Mashru is explicitly mentioned in the administrative document, the Ain-i-Akbari, of the 16th-century Mughal Empire, under silken kinds of stuff: "... the ordinary orthodox Muslim was only anxious to wear clothes of simple material like linen and to avoid silk, velvet, brocade, or fur and coloured ... Mashru." Mixed silk-and-cotton textiles were worn, because, by canon, a Muslim must not wear a dress of pure silk. Varieties containing silk and cotton admixtures gained greater currency in the empire, more particularly after the issuance of the Ain-i-Akbari. During the Mughal period, Mashru was used for the costumes of courtiers and nobles. Mashru is presumed to be an Indian innovation.

=== Etymology ===
The word mashru means 'permitted', derived from mashry in Arabic, and misry (or misru) refers to a mixture in Sanskrit. These names generally mean 'permitted', but it is also related to the Sanskrit word misru, meaning 'mixed'.

== Texture and types ==
=== Production and texture ===
Mashru has been primarily produced in Punjab, Sindh and western parts of India. It is a double-layered material with a thick cotton base and covered with an almost single stranded silken warp and woof. Mashru is a stout, silken, warp-faced fabric textile with a variegated pattern. In its weaving, the loom brings the cotton yarn down and the silk fibers up. This produces a cloth that exhibits a silk face and cotton backing. Hence it was a mix of silk and cotton, although with a satin finish. The result is a thick and heavy cloth with less lustrous and feminine-like pure silk.

=== Types ===
Mashru with silk face and cotton inside was useful for various dresses and household items. Indigenous mashru was famous for its strength and aesthetics. "All 'Mushroos' wash well, especially the finer kinds..." There are varieties of mashru clothes, including gulbadan and sufi. Superior kinds of material are categorized as mashru; and lower quality are called sangi. Mashru is less expensive than pure silk.

== Religious admonition ==
The wearing of pure silk, particularly next to the skin, was widely held to be an impious luxury for good Muslims. "Pure silk is not allowed to men, but women may wear the most sumptuous silk fabrics" Unlike pure silk, the blend was lawful. Hence, it was an acceptable and popular type of cloth among Muslim men in northern India and Pakistan. A similar type of cloth called kutnu was found in the Near East. "The ikat velvet pieces which have been located so far and can be identified as Indian are similar in style to the mashru being woven in western India ... for the basic foundation and this may have been prepared specially for the conservative Muslim who did not use silk thread. 19 Ain-i-Akbari also mentions that Akbar received textiles signed by Giyatyad - Din Ali Naqshband.

== See also ==
- Alacha
- Gulbadan (silk cloth)
- Garbi cloth
