= Ghalta =

Kind of mixed cloth of silk from Hindustan

Ghalta was an old Hindustani fabric made of silk and cotton. Additionally, it was given the name " Azamgarh Satinette." According to John Shakespear, Ghalta was also referred to "a thick sort of cloth."

== Weave ==
Ghalta was a mixed cloth made of silk and cotton yarns. Ghalta had a standard length of 9 yards and a width of 26 inches.

The word "Ghalta" derives from the Persian "Ghaltidaan." which means "to roll." The cloth was finished with hot cylinders to give it a smooth glazed aesthetic. It was calendered and pressed so firmly on the surface that no cotton yarns could be seen, while the back side of the fabric shows all cotton yarns with little silk.

Ghalta has a characterised check pattern that is bound with one, two, or three lines, and the portion between the one direction may be filled with another (different than the rest of the fabric) coloured silk that creates a combination of checks and stripes. There were more patterns as well.

=== Use ===
Ladies preferred plain Ghalta in pink shades, while men favored pale yellow (makhania) in the same. Yellow stripes on red ground were a traditional pattern for wedding ceremonies. Ghalta was used in achkan, angarkha, sherwani, and coats in a similar way to Mashru.

== Production ==
Ghalta was produced in a number of towns, including Mubarakpur, which had been producing textiles since the 18th and early nineteenth centuries. Azamgarh, Khairabad, Mau, and Varanasi were the other towns producing Ghalta. Azamgarh was known for its high-quality Ghalta.

Ghalta held a prominent position in the provincial silk industry. In the 18th century, it was traded to Nepal and nearby Awadh.
