= Habibur Rahman Khairabadi =

Indian Mufti

Mawlānā, Mufti Habībur Rahmān Khairābadi

Personal details
- Born: 11 August 1933 (age 92) Khairabad, Azamgarh, India (Present day in Mau)

Personal life
- Notable work: Hadīth al-misk al-shadhi
- Education: Madrasa Ehya-ul-Uloom, Darul Uloom Mau, Mazahir Uloom, Aligarh Muslim University

Religious life
- Religion: Islam
- Denomination: Sunni, Hanafi
- Movement: Deobandi

Muslim leader
- Disciples: Syed Rezaul Karim

Habībur Rahmān Khairābadi (also known as Mufti Habībur Rahmān; born 11 August 1933) is an Indian Muslim scholar and jurist who serves as a Mufti at the Darul Uloom Deoband. He is an alumnus of Darul Uloom Mau, Mazahir Uloom and the Aligarh Muslim University. He has authored books including The Rules of Slaughter and The Importance of Zakat. He signed the Darul Uloom Deoband's first ever religious edict against terrorism in 2008.

== Biography ==
Habībur Rahmān Khairābadi was born on 11 August 1933 in Khairabad, then in Azamgarh. He was schooled at Madrasa Ehya-ul-Uloom in Mubarakpur, the Darul Uloom Mau and the Dārul Muballigheen in Lucknow. He graduated from Mazahir Uloom where he studied the Sihah Sitta and books such as Tafsir al-Baydawi. He received a B.A and an M.A from the Aligarh Muslim University. He privately studied Sahih Bukhari and Jami' al-Tirmidhi with Hussain Ahmad Madani; and Al-Mutanabbi's Dīwān with Mirajul Haq Deobandi.

After completion of his education, Khairābadi taught at the Mahd-e-Millat in Malegaon for five years and then at the Idāra Maḥmudiyyah in Lakhimpur for two years. He later joined Madrasa Hayāt-ul-Uloom in Moradabad where he served the department of Islamic jurisprudence for twenty-three years. In 1984, he was appointed a teacher in Darul Uloom Deoband and briefly transferred to the seminary's Darul Ifta. At the Darul Uloom Deoband, Khairābadi teaches the books of Islamic jurisprudence including Al-Durr al-Mukhtar, Rasm al-Mufti and Sirāji. His students include the Mufti's of Madrasa Shahi Salmān Mansoorpuri and Shabbīr Aḥmad. Among his spiritual disciples is Syed Rezaul Karim, leader of Islami Andolan Bangladesh.

In 2008, Khairābadi signed a religious edict from Darul Uloom Deoband against terrorism. The edict stated that, "Islam rejects all kinds of unwarranted violence, breach of peace, bloodshed, killing and plunder and does not allow it in any form. It is the basic principle of Islam that you assist each other in pursuit of good righteous causes and do not co-operate with anyone for committing sin or oppression. It is evident in the clear cut guidelines given in the Holy Quran that the allegation of terrorism against a religion like Islam which enjoins world peace is nothing but a lie. In fact Islam was born to wipe of all kinds of terrorism and to spread the message of global peace". The edict was said to be first ever such to be issued from the seminary.

== Literary works ==
Habībur Rahmān has written a marginalia on Jami' al-Tirmidhi entitled Hadīth al-misk al-shadhi. His other works include:

- Hāshiya Fatāwa Rashīdiya (A marginalia on the Fatāwa Rashīdiya of Rashid Ahmad Gangohi)
- Masā'il-e-Qurbāni (The rules of slaughter)
- Ramadan awr Uske Roze (The month of Ramadan and its fasts)
- Shab-e-Barāt awr Qur'ān (Shab-e-barat in the light of Quran)
- Sharah Mufīd-ut-tālibīn (A marginalia on Mufīd-ut-tālibīn)
- Zakāt ki Ahmiyyat (The importance of zakat)

== See also ==
- List of Deobandis

== Bibliography ==
- Qāsmi, Aftāb Ghāzi; Qāsmi, Abdul Haseeb (February 2011). Fuzala-e-Deoband Ki Fiqhi Khidmat [Services of the Graduates of Deoband in Islamic Jurisprudence] (in Urdu) (1st ed.). Deoband: Kutub Khana Naimia. p. 143, 350-352. OCLC 813691816.
