= Alacha =

Lightweight striped silk or cotton cloth

Alacha ('lacha' or 'alacha' or 'elatches' or 'alaja', ālājah) is a lightweight striped cloth made primarily of silk, sometimes cotton, or a mixture of both. The stripe pattern was evident on both sides of the fabric. A typical length of alacha is five yards. It was produced in various parts of India, for example Baikunthpur, Bihar. The cloth was popular in use for female garments such as dupattas (odhni), veils, and petticoats.

== Etymology ==
François Bernier mentions "...alachas were silken stuffs striped". Alacha may be an earlier term used for mashru cloth, derived from the Sanskrit word alasa meaning "swan-footprint patterned creeper". Yashodhara Agrawal, writing in an essay entitled "Mashru as a Trade Textile", translates khanjari as "dagger"—referring to a single arrowhead motif. Khanjari can also be described as a wavy line pattern. Agrawal notes that alacha or alaja was the word used for this fabric before mashru came into common use. She speculates that alacha could refer to the arrowhead pattern found in many mashru fabrics of Gujarat. She and others point out that the lower garment of Queen Sivali in a painting in the Ajanta Cave One, dating from the fifth century AD, is patterned with warp resist, suggesting that this fabric has been in production for well over a millennium.

== Texture ==
The texture of alacha was different from Doriya but closer to Charconnaes. Doriya was filmsy.

== Types ==
Alacha is mainly produced with red and white or blue and white colored stripes. They were originally named after their origin or production towns. The quality was varying with the contents of silk and cotton. Bengal alachas were rich in silk and Gujarat alachas were made chiefly with cotton.

Alleja was a variation from Turkestan. These were made in the lengths of five yards. It was a patterned cloth with wavy design on both sides of the cloth.

== Export ==
Alacha was among a noted item of silk goods of East India Company. Further, Alachas became a severe threat to local manufacturing in England, their import was stopped in 1720, and they tried to duplicate the fabric locally.

== See also ==
- Alamode
- Qutni
- Gulbadan
