= Heinrich Blochmann =

German orientalist and scholar (1838–1878)

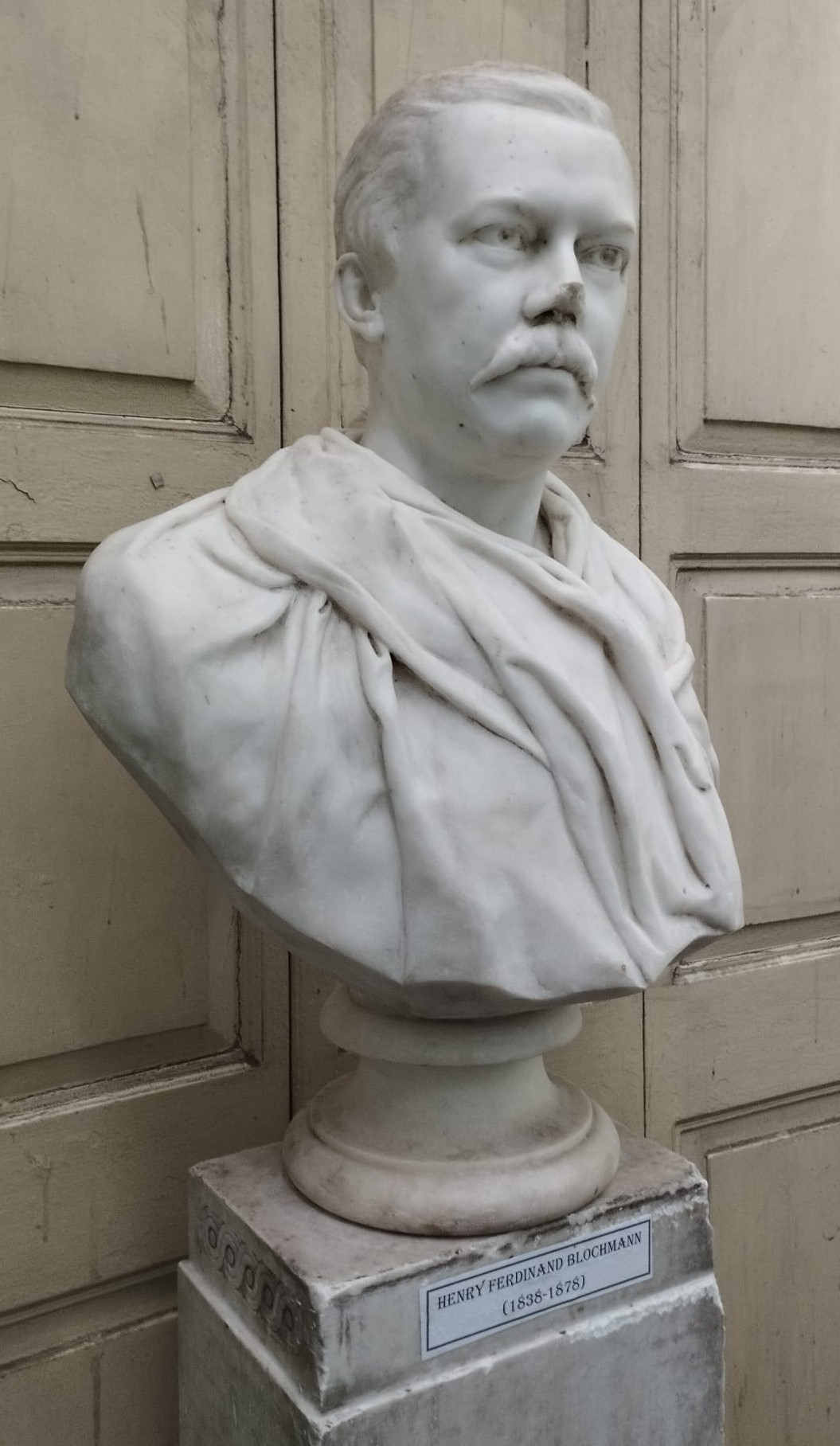
Heinrich (Henry) Ferdinand Blochmann (1838–1878), bust by Edwin Roscoe Mullins (1848–1907) from 1880 in the rooms of the Asiatic Society of Bengal, Kolkata

Heinrich Blochmann, known as Henry Ferdinand Blochmann (8 January 1838 – 13 July 1878), was a German orientalist and scholar of Persian language and literature who spent most of his career in India, where he worked first as a professor, and eventually as the principal at Calcutta Madrasa, now Aliah University in present Kolkata. He is also remembered for one of the first major English translations of Ain-i-Akbari, the 16th-century Persian language chronicle of Mughal emperor Akbar, published in 1873.

== Early life and background ==
Born at Dresden on 8 January 1838, he was the son of Ernest Ehrenfried Blochmann, printer, and nephew of Karl Justus Blochmann. He was educated at the Kreuzschule and the University of Leipzig (1855), where he studied oriental languages under Heinrich Leberecht Fleischer, and then (1857) was in Paris.

== Career ==
In 1858, Blochmann came to England, intent on visiting India, and enlisted in the British Indian Army in 1858 as a private soldier. Soon after his arrival in Calcutta he was set to do office-work in Fort William, and gave lessons in Persian. After about a year he obtained his army discharge, and for a time entered the service of P&O as an interpreter. He was befriended by William Nassau Lees, the principal of the Calcutta Madrasa (now Aliah University), and Blochmann obtained, at the age of 22, his first government appointment (1860) as assistant professor of Arabic and Persian there. In 1861 he graduated M.A. and LL.D. at the University of Calcutta, choosing Hebrew for the subject of his examination. In the following year he left the Madrasa to become pro-rector and professor of mathematics, at Doveton College; but returning to the Madrasa in 1865, he remained there for the rest of his life, and was principal when he died.

Blochmann made archæological tours in India and British Burma, but generally resided in Calcutta. In 1868 he became philological secretary to the Asiatic Society of Bengal. He died on 13 July 1878, and was buried in the Circular Road cemetery, Calcutta.

== Works ==
Blochmann's major work was his translation of the Ain-i-Akbari of Abu'l-Fazl ibn Mubarak; the earlier version of Francis Gladwin was more in the way of a summary. Blochmann did not live to do more than translate the first volume (Calcutta, 1873), and the work was completed by Henry Sullivan Jarrett. Blochmann's notes dealt with the Emperor Akbar and his court, and the administration of the Mughal Empire; and prefixed to the translation was a life of Abul-Fazl. This translation was revised, from 1927, by Douglas Craven Phillott and Jadunath Sarkar. Another significant work was The Prosody of the Persians, Calcutta, 1872.

For the Asiatic Society of Bengal, Blochmann wrote in the Journal and Proceedings. These papers included his series of Contributions to the History and Geography of Bengal.

== Family ==
Blochmann married an Irish woman, who survived him, and left three children.
