= Devoré =

Fabric pattern creation technique using acid

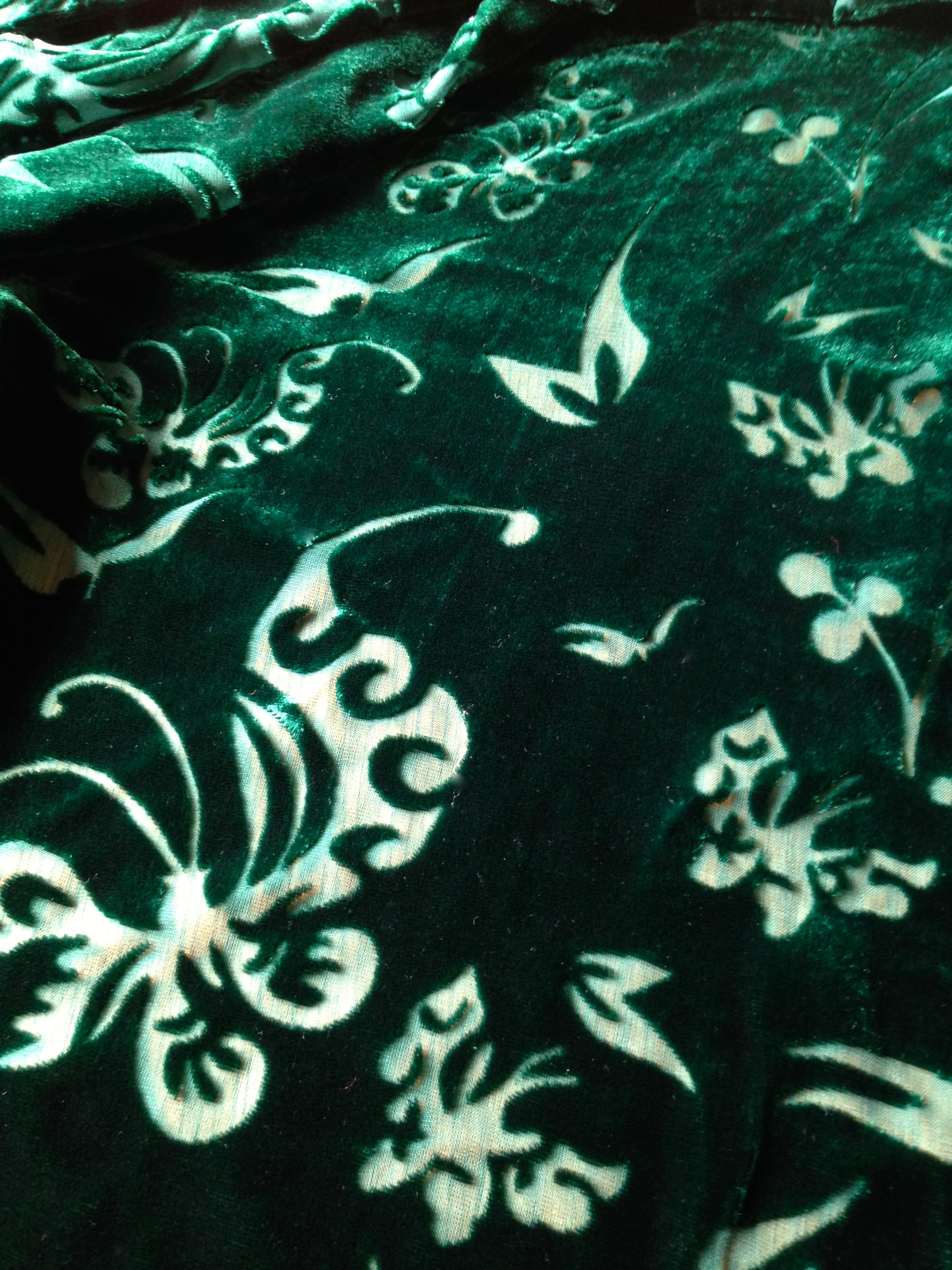
Devoré – or burnout technique – applied to green velvet fabric

Devoré (also called burnout) is a fabric technique particularly used on velvets, where a mixed-fibre material undergoes a chemical process to dissolve the cellulose fibres to create a semi-transparent pattern against more solidly woven fabric. The same technique can also be applied to textiles other than velvet, such as lace or the fabrics in burnout t-shirts.

Devoré comes from the French verb dévorer, meaning literally to devour.

== History ==
Burnout fabrics are thought to have originated in France, possibly as a cheap alternative to lace that could be created using caustic paste on fabric. The commercial chemical process used in fashion garments was developed in Lyon at the turn of the 19th and 20th centuries.

The technique was popularised in the 1920s – typically used on evening gowns and shawls – and revived in the 1980s and '90s, notably by Jasper Conran on theatrical costumes and then evening wear and by Georgina von Etzdorf on scarves.

=== 1990s revival ===
Conran is credited with popularising devoré, introducing it in 1989 and taking the technique forward in the 1990s in his main fashion line. He refined his techniques on theatrical costumes; in the 1992 production of My Fair Lady directed by Simon Callow, burnout fabrics were heavily used for the costumes of Eliza Doolittle and street vendors. Conran's devoré technique also featured in David Bintley's 1993 Royal Ballet production of Tombeaux, where it was used to create the two-tone velvet tutu worn by Darcey Bussell and the corps de ballet costumes. In 1994, it featured in the Scottish Ballet production of The Sleeping Beauty, where Conran said it produced better results for lower cost than appliqué techniques.

Conran's most elaborate devoré fashion pieces – which were oven baked as part of the process – were time-consuming to produce and expensive to buy; in 1993, a panelled evening skirt retailed at £572 and an acid-treated shirt cost £625.

Established as a Wiltshire textile printing workshop in 1981, Georgina von Etzdorf's primary focus was on creating painterly effects on fabric. Credited with popularising the velvet scarf, she introduced devoré to her range in 1993 – having experimented with printed velvets from 1985.

== Method ==
Devoré techniques use blended fabrics which combine protein-based fibres such as silk with cellulose-based fibres such as viscose, cotton, or rayon. In order to create the 'burnout' pattern, a chemical gel containing sodium hydrogen sulphate is applied to the fabric in patterns, dissolving away the cellulose-based fibres and leaving behind the protein-based fibres, which are not affected by the chemical. The chemical gel may be applied either by printing or by hand painting on the fabric.

== See also ==
- Cellulose fiber
- Chemical lace
- Fabric
- Fiber
- Glossary of textile manufacturing
- Synthetic fiber
- Textile manufacturing
- Textile manufacturing terminology
