= Plated fabric =

Fabrics that have different colors or types of face and back

Plated fabrics are fabrics that have different colors or types of face and back. The fabrics are formed by using different kinds of yarn types or colors to both be invisible on the other side. Different properties of several textile fibers are exploited to obtain various surface interests and patterns. One of the aspects is the thermophysiological and moisture comfort of clothing.

== Manufacture and structure ==
Plated fabrics are the combination of two separate yarns of different properties. The knitted plated fabrics are produced by an arrangement of needles that do not bring the back yarn to the face (also called right side of the fabric) or the face yarn to the back.

Particular knitting machines allow the selective knitting of separate yarns on the face and back to form plated fabrics.

== Function and use ==
Layers made of fibers with contrasting characteristics, appropriately selected, can help in producing improved clothing functionality. Different fibers have different properties. Natural fibers are often hygroscopic, and synthetics are more commonly hydrophobic. The contrast of these properties can be used to obtain different functionality. For example, fabrics with cotton on the outside and polyester or polypropylene inside are suitable for moisture wicking.

=== Advantages ===
Plated fabric can improve clothing comfort through thermophysiological and moisture comfort by reducing the sensation of dampness.

== See also ==
- Technical textile
