= Kimkhwab =

Traditional brocade from India

Kimkhwab (Kim-Khwab, kamkhāb, ḳamkhwāb, Kimkhwab, Hiranya, puspapata) is an ancient Indian brocade art of weaving ornate cloth with gold, silver, and silk yarns. Kinkhwab is a silk damasked cloth with an art of zar-baft (making cloth of gold), The weave produces beautiful floral designs that appear embroidered on the surface of the fabric. it was also known as puspapata or cloth with woven flowers.

Kimkhwab is a fabric of silk with leaves and branches woven in it "Kamkwabs, or kimkhwabs (Kincob), are also known as zar-baft (gold-woven), and mushajjar (having patterns)."—Yusuf Ali The mushajjar is also mentioned in Ain-i-Akbari.

== Name ==
“Kimkhwab” is a Persian word that means a little dream.

Hiranya means cloth of gold, as mentioned in Vedas (c. 1500 BC). And in It is called puspapata during Gupta empire (4th–6th century AD).

== Etymology ==
Kimkhwāb derived from Persian. kam-khwāb, 'less sleep,' because such cloth is rough and prevents sleep! "The ordinary derivation of the word supposes that a man could not even dream of it who had not seen it (kam, 'little,' khwāb, 'dream')".

Platts and the Madras Gloss. take it from kam, 'little,' khwāb, 'nap.'

== Texture ==
The art has a flavor of Arab-Persian culture in it. The fabric was woven with tapestry weave, Kimkhwab was nearly thick because of its metallic yarns and patterns, but some fine qualities were also there, especially for wealthy people. Most of the patterns were floral, nature inspired such as plants such as the poppy, and pine tree, etc.

== Manufacturing ==
Kimkhwab work of Varanasi, Surat was famous in the Mughal Empire from 1556 to 1707. Two more centers, Aurangabad and Paithan, were also noted for their production. The value was priced with contents of gold, silver, or silk and motifs.

== See also ==
- Clothing in India
- Brocade
