= Moisture management =

Functional property in fabrics to transfer moisture and dry quickly

Moisture management or moisture-wicking is a functional property in textiles that enables them to transfer moisture from the skin, by capillary action through the fabric, spreading it over a large external surface area, which helps in drying quickly. The property is one of the most important for thermal comfort of textiles.

== Moisture wicking ==
Moisture-wicking clothes adsorb the liquid sweat on the skin and spread it along the surface of the fibres by capillary attraction to the external surface of the clothing, which is exposed to drier air, and where it evaporates more quickly, in comparison with a clothing item which absorbs and retains the water in the fibres. Hence it avoids mass retention of the moisture and the associated feeling of dampness.

The transport of liquid water through an unsaturated textile is a combination of wetting and wicking, and diffusion of absorbed water through the fibre. Without wetting, there can be no wicking as the contact angle between water and fibre will have no tendency to pull the water along the contact surface. Capillary flow in the plane of the fabric is called in-plane wicking, transverse wicking, or horizontal wicking. Capillary flow orthogonal to the plane of the fabric may be called transplanar wicking, transplanar uptake, or transplanar flow. Several factors are known to influence wicking in a fabric. These include the arrangement of the fibres, the material of the fibres, the composition of the liquid, the shape and alignment of the wetted surface, the geometry of the channels through which wicking occurs, and absorption of the liquid into the material of the fibres. Ambient temperature and humidity also influence the rate of fluid transfer by wicking.

The migration of moisture through multiple layers of clothing or through plated fabric is more complicated and is affected by the order of layers with different wicking and absorptive characteristics.

=== Fibre properties: volume and arrangement ===
Mixtures of fibre types may be defined in terms of mass or volume ratio. This blending ratio is a strong predictor of moisture transport characteristics. Fibre arrangement is also important to moisture transport, and there are three basic classes, woven, knitted and non-woven fabrics. Wicking effects are governed by surface effects, so a large surface area of the fibres is more effective, and this is determined by fibre diameter and cross sectional form for a given mass of a given material.

=== Moisture comfort ===
Moisture comfort in clothing is the protection from the sensation of dampness. A study of the human body's response by sweating Hollies suggests, '' When more than 50–65% of the body surface is wet, it feels uncomfortable.''

Though cotton is a comfortable and skin-friendly natural fibre, its high absorbency ratio makes it very uncomfortable to wear once saturated.

Cellulose and protein based natural fibres have a considerably higher water absorption capacity than most synthetic fibres.

== Application ==
An article of clothing with moisture-wicking properties helps in enhancing the performance of the wearer. Hence it is helpful in sportswear and athleisure.

== Test ==
The property is quantifiable through various test procedures. Example tests are ISO 13029:2012, and AATCC TM195.

Objective test methods for water absorption and transport in fabrics include:

- Siphon test, vertical wicking and transverse wicking tests.
- Optical measurement of contact angle.
- Spectroscopic methods.
- Electrical methods.
- Magnetic resonance, and temperature based methods for detecting wetness by evaporative cooling.

== See also ==
- Plated fabric is a suitable fabric construction for moisture-wicking fabrics.
- Fabric softener – Chemical conditioner applied to laundry during the washing cycle
