= Punjum =

Kind of Indian cotton cloth

Punjum (panjam, pŭn′jŭm; pun jum) was a type of Indian cotton cloth. It was produced in the Northern Circars, on the Coromandel Coastal region in South East India. Punjum was a kind of cotton longcloth that was produced in a variety of thread counts.

== Varieties of punjum ==
Punjum was a woven fabric structure with an unusually strong texture. It was manufactured with a variety of widths from coarser to finer qualities (The finer the threads the greater number of punjums were contained in the breadth up to 40). There were Punjums available with a 120-thread count . A Punjum was regarded as a sign of quality, there were different numbers assigned for different grades ranging from 10,12,14,16, 18 up to 40.The lowest and coarse was called number 10. Later, Baramauhal successfully duplicated an imitation of Punjum which was a cloth with a lower thread count and half the length of the former. It was named Salampore.

=== Dimensions ===
John Forbes Watson used sample 466 to show Punjum in his book, "The textile manufacturers and the clothes of the people of India." As per John, a common piece of Punjum weighs 14 pounds and is 18 yards long (36 Cubits). Its width ranges from 38 to 44 inches.

== Exports ==
Punjum cloths accounted for a sizable portion of Madras' exports in the 18th century. Fourteen and sixteen number Punjum, Salampores, Palampores, Chintz, Book muslin and Longcloth, varieties of Ghingahm were among the piece goods which were exported to America from Madras.

== See also ==
- Piece goods
