= Qutni =

Striped silk cloth

Qutni (cuttanee, couthnys, Koetnies, Kutni) is an old silk and cotton mixed cloth with a striped pattern. Qutni is a satin weave structure with silk in warp and cotton in the weft. It was made in Gujarat, India. Qutni was also produced at Damascus, Aleppo, Hama.

== Types ==
=== Qutni or Cuttanee ===
Cuttanee (Persian: قطنى) was related to silk alachas. Qutni of Gujarat was a Satin weave with silk threads in warp and cotton in the weft. Gujarat was exporting Qutni in large to Europe and much appreciated for quilts.

Cuttanee, also called cotonis, cuttance, or cutance, was a fine heavy and stout silk and cotton satin of East India, with bright coloured woven stripes and sometimes floral designs, used for quilts and upholstery. It was a product of Gujarat in the 17th and 18th centuries, and made primarily for export trade.

=== Rich Qutni ===
Damascus designed various silk cloths where Qutni and Alza were significant. They were making two types of Qutni, simple and rich, both with the same quantity of silk and cotton. The rich Qutni (Arabic: manqusheh) is a silk satin stripe patterned cloth in which weft is a foundation and warp creating the patterns. It is a superior fabric to simple Qutni.

Qutni was weaved as per market specified dimensions; for example, Length 6.13 meters width 0.7 meters was for Syria, Baghdad and Constantinople, Smyrna, and Persia. But for Egypt, the length was slightly more, i.e., 6.83 with the same width.

=== Mashru ===
Mashru silk samples in John Forbes Watson book elicits Qutni as Roques reports cottonis variations including stripes of cotton and silk that insinuates Mashru, the most related cloth from Gujrat, i.e., Qutni while J. Irwin compared alaja to Qutni.

== Mentions ==
- Persian merchants introduced many Indian cloths in Turkey, The 1640 price list from Istanbul mentions qutni from Yazd made ''like the Indian''(qutni-i Yezd manend-i Hind) or the Persian qutni 'in seven colours made in the Indian style (manend-i Hind heft-renk qutni-i agemi).
- Abu'l-Fazl mentions Qutni as a mix of silk and wool with a price of 1.5 to 2.0 R per piece in the Ain-i-Akbari.
- Bouiteneige is another word for a silk and cotton mix.

== See also ==
- Silk
- Khazz silk
- Ain-i-Akbari
- Warp and weft
- Silk in the Indian subcontinent
