= Gulbadan (silk cloth) =

Kind of striped silk

Gulbadan (silk cloth) was a kind of striped silk produced in Hindustan. The gulbadan ( literal meaning a body like the rose ) was a light textured cloth of silk and cotton. Gulbadan has vertical variegated stripes with a different color than the base color of the cloth. In appearance, it was similar to a glazed calico, unlike Mashru, which has the satin (lustrous) surface.The contemporary silk piece goods were Daryai (plain silk) and Dhupehan (shot silk). Gulbadan was available in many color combinations and sizes. Gulbadan of Amritsar and Lahore were famous. "Sufi" was another name for Gulbadan striped fabric.

A type Sohren Gulbadan was prepared with specific dimensions, i.e., 36 feet long and 1 foot and 4 inches wide.

== Texture ==
Unlike its name, the fabric was ordinary and usually thick. The surface feels like a peach with no to less luster.

== Use ==
Gulbadan was mainly used for pajamas. Sohren Gulbadan was used in ladies' shirts and trousers.

== See also ==
- Kimkhwab
- Alacha
- Sangi (cloth)
