= Alamode, Missouri =

Extinct hamlet in Missouri, U.S.

Coordinates: 37.3131°N 90.9962°W

Alamode is an extinct town in Reynolds County, in the U.S. state of Missouri.

A post office called Alamode was established in 1846, and remained in operation until 1909. It is unknown why the name "Alamode" was applied to this community; the name was possibly borrowed from the French à la mode.
