= Daryayi =

Old silk fabric from India

Daryayi was an old silk fabric. It may have been named for the fabric's wavy or striped pattern, as in darya, دریا), which means 'river' in Central Asian Persian. Daryayi silk was made in Meerut and Lucknow until the late eighteenth century by weavers known as daryayi baff. These weavers, most likely migrated to India from Central Asia, a well-known silk-weaving region between the Syr and Amu Darya rivers. This twelve-inch-wide fabric comes in a range of colors like red, yellow, blue, green, and white. Daryayi was used as a patka (bridegroom's sash) in Hindu wedding ceremonies, or as a border for women's clothing.

Abul Fazl included Daryayi silk in his list of contemporary silk textiles.

Daryayi silk has 480 single warp yarns or 280 double warp yarns in its weave structure.
