= Alamode =

17th-century silk material, used in England and France

Alamode (Allamod) was a thin, soft, fine, and lustrous silk material. It was one of England's local silk varieties. However, it was recognized as ''Alamode'' in the early 17th century before it was famous for its use in scarves.

== Weave ==
It was a plain weave fabric.

== Use ==
The use of Alamode extended up to the 18th century, and it was majorly used in scarves and hoods. In addition, it was used for jackets and also as a mourning cloth.

== See also ==
- Alacha, a silk that was imitated in England after prohibiting imports from India.
