= Heather (fabric) =

Fabric made of interwoven yarns of mixed colors

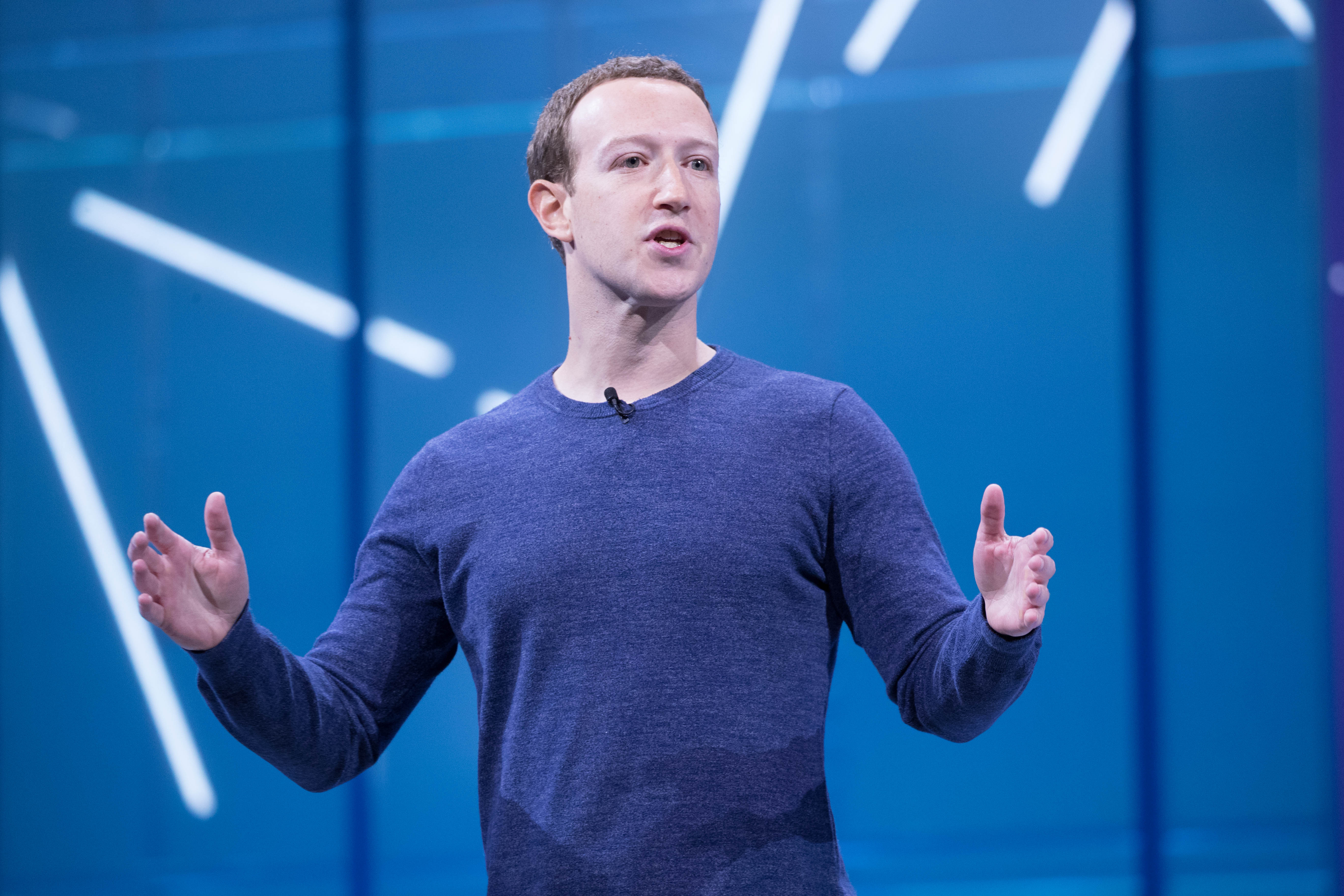
Mark Zuckerberg in blue heather shirt

In clothing, heather refers to a color effect created by mixing two or more different colored fibers or yarns. It is interwoven yarns of mixed colors, and possibly the type of fiber, producing another color. It is typically used to mix multiple shades of grey or grey with another color to produce a muted shade (e.g., heather green), but any two colors can be mixed, including bright colors. A mixed fabric color is achieved by using different colors of fiber and mixing them together (a good example is a grey heather t-shirt). Black and white fiber mixed will combine to give grey heather fiber. Heather is blended fibers combined to create a multicolored effect. Heather effect is also known as melange effect.

== Methods ==
Fundamentally it is a mixing of the different colored fibers and yarns combined in one fabric. The methods may involve one of the following

- Melange (yarn)—Fiber dyeing in different color and then mixing (in desired percentages) and spinning.
- Marl or Marled—Jaspe-Roving Grindle.
- Cross dyeing—Using blended yarns and cross dyeing

=== Melange yarns ===
The term "melange yarn" is derived from the French word mélange, meaning a mixture. Melange yarns are made with mixed fibers dyed before yarn spinning. Melange yarns yield economical blended textile materials.

=== Marl yarn ===
Marl or Marled yarn is a plied yarn. The doubling process produces the Marl yarn. Two yarns of different colors or may be of two different types are twisted together to make one. The texture of the resultant yarn is other than regular yarn. The process helps in producing fancy yarns.

Jaspe is similar yarns produced by twisting different colored yarns or spinning yarn from two different colored rovings.

=== Cross dyeing ===
Heather yarn may be more expensive than regular yarns because of other processes involved during fiber dyeing or yarn dyeing in the case of heather effect. The cross dyeing of blends may also create the heather effect. Different fibers types respond differently to the dyes. Cross dyeing is the way of dyeing constituting fibers in different colors. Selection of dyes and fiber composition plays a vital role in this case.

Depending on the percent of cotton, the fabric can still be legally labeled 100% cotton.

== Importance and use ==
Manipulating parts of fiber (by color or type) produce different shades in the heather. Many weaves and knit structures are possible with them. Heather effects add value to the products and increase the range and variety of textiles options other than piece-dyed/solids and prints. Grey heather in T-shirts is one of the most famous colors in heathers.
