= Salampore =

Kind of cotton cloth produced in India

Salampore (salempore) was a kind of cotton cloth produced in India. It had been in use since the 17th century and was exported to Europe and Africa.

== Exports ==
Salempores was part of a varied collection of cloths such as long cloth, moris, and cloth with gold thread exported to various foreign locations like Bantam, Manila, and London from the Coromandel Coast. It was also exported to Africa and South America.

== Production ==
Salampore was produced at various locations of India from north to down south.

=== Pattern ===
It was a colored woven cloth with stripe and check designs. Few sources also describe it as broad white or blue cotton fabric.

=== Cloth for slaves ===
It was also called a cloth for slaves, mainly the blue cotton cloth made from Nellore.

=== Dimensions ===
The usual dimensions of Salampore were 16X1 yards. Salampore was coarser and had fewer threads than Punjum. It was also half the length of the Punjum..

== See also ==
- Khadi
- Piece goods
