= Man-cheti =

14th century cotton stuff from India

Man cheti was a "ginger yellow" cotton cloth made in India in the 15th century. Made in lengths of fifty feet and a width of four feet or more, it was a closely woven cloth with a sturdy construction.

== Mentions (Ma Huan's account of Bengal) ==
Chinese translator, voyager and writer Ma Huan noted ''Man - chê - ti'' in addition to other Indian cotton varieties in his account of Bengal.
