= Khairabad, Mau =

Khairabad
- Town
- Location in Uttar Pradesh, India Khairabad (India)
- Coordinates: 26.041438°N 83.362820°E
- Country: India
- State: Uttar Pradesh
- District: Mau
- Tehsil: Muhammadabad Gohna

Government
  - Type: Municipal board (India)
  - Body: Gram Panchayat

Languages
  - Official: Hindi
  - Other spoken: Bhojpuri
- Time zone: UTC+5:30 (IST)
- Pin code: 276403
- Telephone code: 0547
- Vehicle registration: UP-54
- Website: up.gov.in

Khairabad is a census town in Mau district, in the eastern part of Uttar Pradesh, India. It is located on the Mau-Azamgarh route, adjacent to Muhammadabad Gohna.Khairabad is known for

== Demographics ==
At the 2011 census, Khairabad had a population of 12,056(males 51%, females 49%). Khairabad has an average literacy rate of 60%, higher than the national average of 59.5%. The male literacy rate was 65% and female literacy is 54%. 23% of the population was under 6 years of age. The main occupation is the production of sarees from silk, cotton, mercerized and other synthetic yarns which are sent to Varanasi, Bengaluru, Kolkata, Surat, Chennai, Ahmedabad, Bikaner and many other cities.

Religions in Khairabad, Mau
Religion	Percent
Muslims	84.96%
Hindus	14.82%
Christianity	0.17%
Jains	0.01%
Buddhism	0.01%
Others†	0.3%

== Educational institutions ==
- Madrasah Manbaul Uloom
- Heaven Garden School
- Momin Ansar Girls Inter College
- Ashrafia Ziaul Uloom
- Madinatul Uloom
- Iqra Public School
- Amina Niyaz School
- Sabera Public School
- Mahadurrahma Littaleem Wattadreeb Ansar Nagar Mohammadabad
- Madrasah Taalimul Quraan

== See also ==
- Habibur Rahman Khairabadi, Indian Islamic scholar from Khairabad in Mau
