= Blend (textile) =

Textile product made out of mixture of two or more fibers

A blend is a mixture of two or more fibers. In yarn spinning, different compositions, lengths, diameters, or colors may be combined to create a blend. Blended textiles are fabrics or yarns produced with a combination of two or more types of different fibers, or yarns to obtain desired traits and aesthetics. Blending is possible at various stages of textile manufacturing. The term, blend, refers to spun fibers or a fabric composed of such fibers. There are several synonymous terms: a combination yarn is made up of two strands of different fibers twisted together to form a ply; a mixture or mixed cloth refers to blended cloths in which different types of yarns are used in warp and weft sides.

Union or union fabric was a 19th century term for a blended fabric. It is no longer used.

== History ==
Blending in textiles is an old practice which became more widespread after around 1980. Recognizing the growing popularity of blends, the Wool Bureau introduced the "Wool blend" mark in 1970 for blends containing a high percentage of wool. Viyella was the first branded blended textile, and it is the oldest blended flannel structure. It features a twill weave of wool and cotton, and due to the cotton content, it can be washed more easily than an all-wool flannel.

- An admixture of silk and cotton from Hindustan called Mashru is one of the earliest forms of "mixed cloth,". In the 12th century A.D., the industry was under the influence of Muslims. While Muslim men were not allowed to wear pure silk due to a religious admonition, a silk-and-cotton blend they made was permitted. It was known as "Mashru." Mashru was the name given to a group of mixed fabrics. Mashru is an Arabic word that literally means "permitted."
- Siamoise was a 17th-century cotton and linen material.

== Fibers for blends ==
=== Spun fibers ===
Any fiber has the potential to contribute to a blended fabric depending upon the intended use. Continuous testing is carried out to determine the optimal fiber blends and the percentages most suited to specific uses. Polyester is the most frequently used synthetic fiber; it has earned the name 'workhorse' fiber of the industry. The staple form of polyester fibers has been referred to as the 'big mixer' because of its compatibility in blending. Polyester imparts many properties without affecting the properties of other fibers.

=== Bicomponent fibers ===
Bicomponent fiber are the fibers produced by mixing two different polymers to achieve the properties of both fibers. For example, polyester and nylon may be mixed together in extrusion. The polymers in the bicomponent may have entirely different physical and chemical properties.

== Advantages ==
Products with blends, mixtures, and combinations may have properties that differ from those obtained with a single fiber. Blending may add value and may reduce the cost of the product. For example, cotton is most often mixed with other fibers, particularly synthetics. This blending can be used to make cotton-like fabrics with improved functionality such as wrinkle resistance and dimensional stability. The addition of spandex to cotton improves the stretch of the product.

=== Spinning advantages ===
==== Uniformity ====
Blending is also used to describe the process of combining small amounts of the same fibers from various lots to produce a uniform result. This process is known as "blending" in spinning. The blending of similar kinds of fibers, or different fibers, is possible at various stages of yarn spinning, such as in the blow room, at the draw frame, and during roving.

==== Spinning weak fibers ====
Blending helps in spinning those fibers which are weak and difficult to spin. For example, milkweed fibers lack strength and cohesion.

==== Core spun yarns ====
In core spun yarns; a filament yarn is wrapped with staple fibers. Spandex filament may be wrapped with cotton fibers to form a core spun yarn. These yarns are called "composite yarns."

=== Functional advantages ===
==== Comfort ====
Blends help in reducing the discomfort of certain synthetic clothing. Synthetic fibers, such as polyester, have a moisture regain rate of only 0.4'0.8 percent. Poor absorbency reduces the comfort of clothing that comes into direct contact with the skin. Blending polyester with absorbent fibers such as cotton improves the wearing comfort. Polyester-cotton blended clothing is more comfortable to wear in humid climates than polyester alone.

A heavy pair of jeans made of 100% cotton that weighs 14 oz (396.9 g) can be cut down to 11 oz (311.8 g), without compromising durability, by changing the composition to a blend of polyester 50% with cotton or nylon 20%.

=== Aesthetic advantages ===
Blends help to create a variety of aesthetic effects.:

==== Plated fabrics ====
Blending is also used to create many weaving and knitting structures, such as plated fabrics.

==== Burnt out patterns ====
Devoré is a pattern-making technique that involves dissolving cellulosic fibers in acids. Typically, a polyester-cotton blend is used for this purpose.

==== Heather or melange fabrics ====
Heather is a term used to describe a color effect created by combining two or more different colored fibers or yarns in a fabric. Grey melange, marl and gaspe are examples of blending fibers and yarns.

===== Cross-dyed fabrics =====
Blends are also used for cross-dyed fabrics. When dyeing fabric with two different classes of dyes in a blend, it is possible to dye both parts in completely different colors. It is called "cross-dyeing."

=== Economical products ===
Besides contributing to comfort and functionality, blends can produce economical materials.

- Camel hair can be blended with sheep wool. Camel hair provides better thermal insulation per weight, and it is finer and more expensive than cotton, so a camelhair-sheepwool blend produces a lighter and warmer blend than sheepwool alone.
- Cotton is frequently blended with polyester; the blend is more economical than a 100% cotton product.
- Cashmere (an expensive wool) and sheep wool are sometimes blended together to make the product cost-effective.

=== Nonwoven fabric advantages ===
Nonwoven fabrics of various types can be manufactured using a blending process. A polyester and viscose blend is used in baby wipes. For different items, distinct weight ratios are used.

== See also ==
- Heather (fabric)
- Technical textile
