= Ain-i-Akbari =

16th-century Mughal Empire document

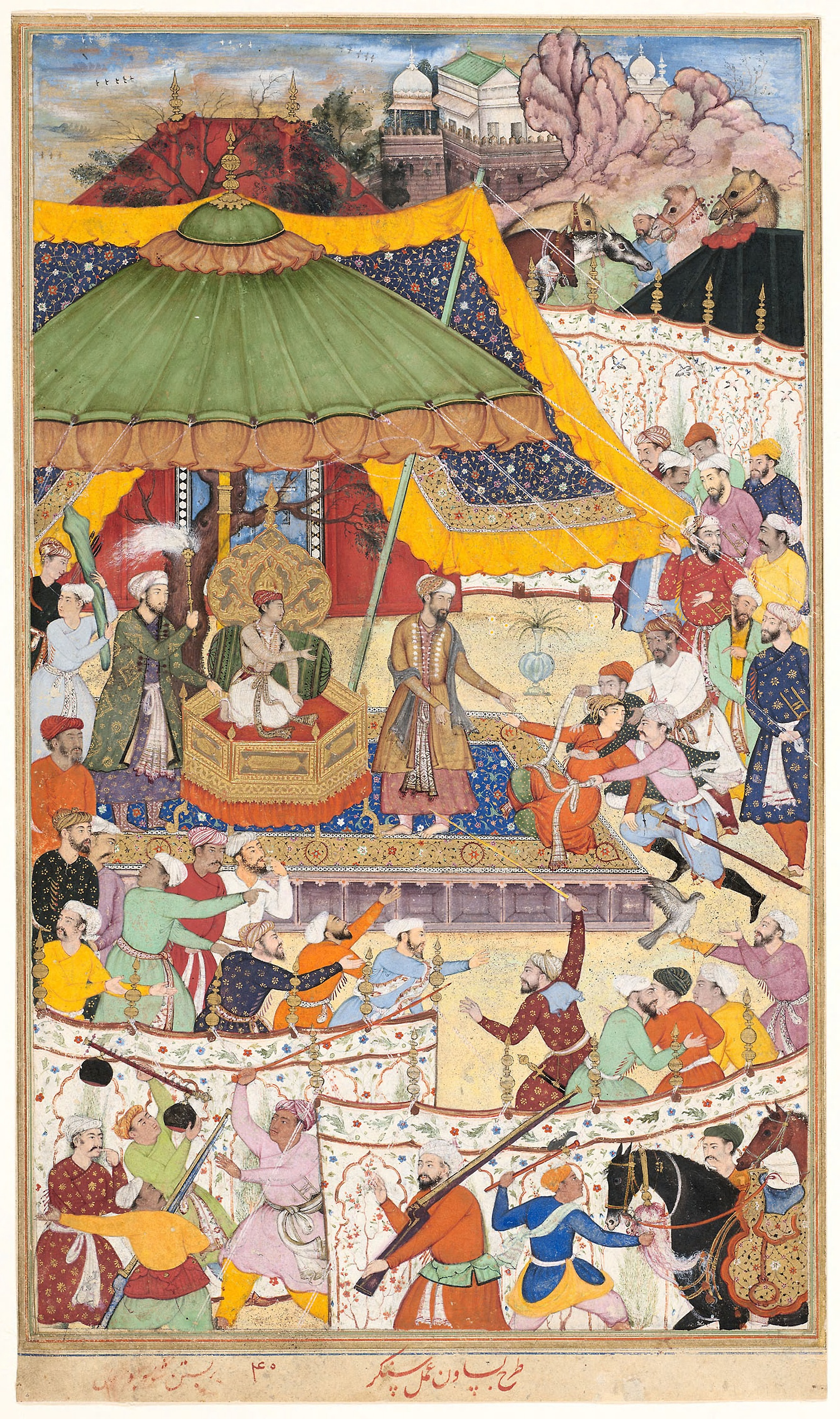
The Court of Akbar, an illustration from a manuscript of the Akbarnama

The Ain-i-Akbari (Persian: آئینِ اکبری), or the "Administration of Akbar", is a detailed document regarding the administration of the Mughal Empire under Emperor Akbar, written by his court historian, Abu'l Fazl, in the Persian language between 1589 and 1596. It forms Volume III and the final part of the much larger document, the Akbarnama (Account of Akbar), also by Abu'l-Fazl.

== Contents ==
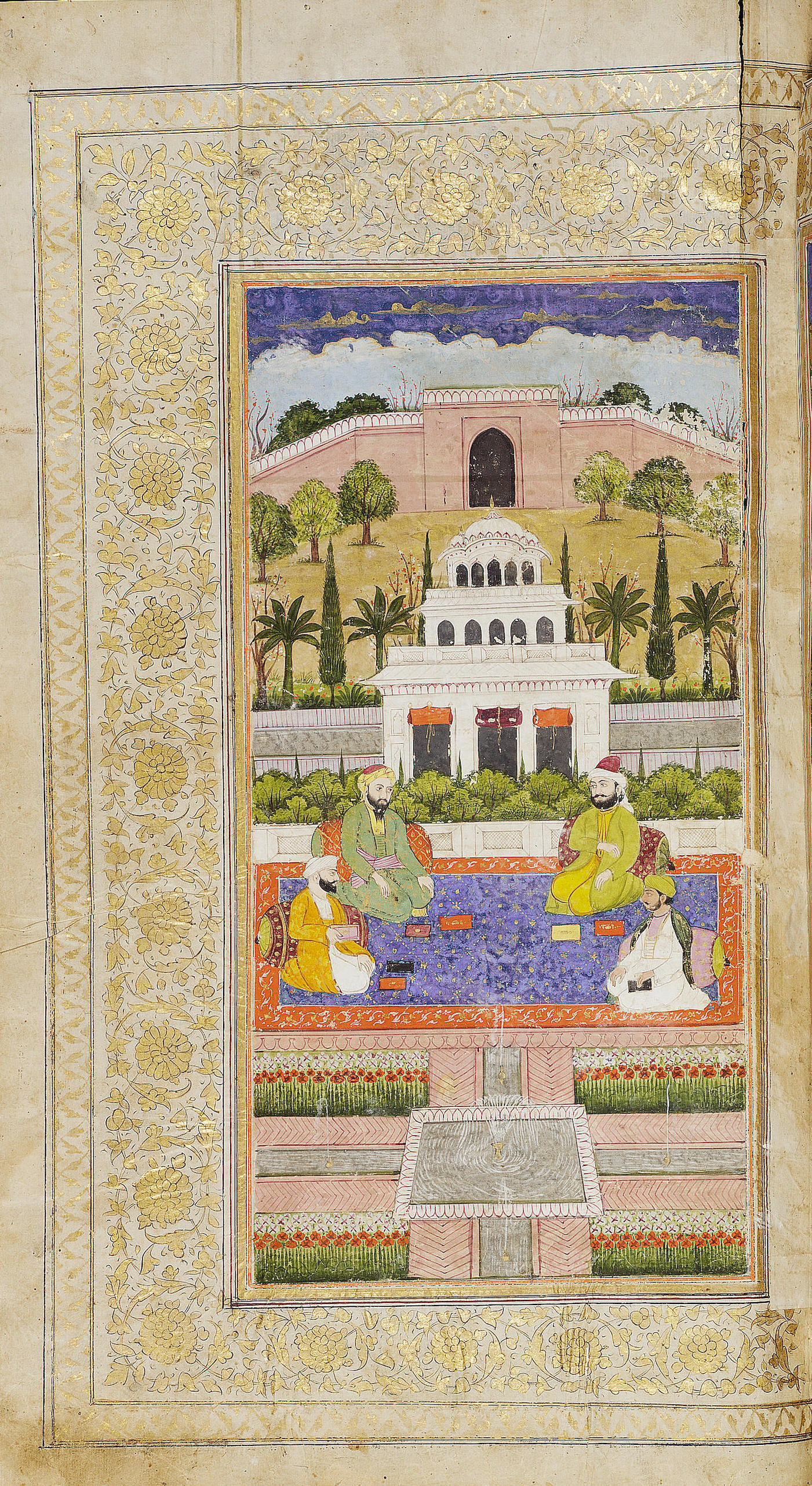
Manuscript painting of the author and advisor, Abul Fazl, seated on a terrace with the completed chronicles before him, from an illustrated 'Ain-i-Akbari' manuscript commissioned by the Sikh Empire.

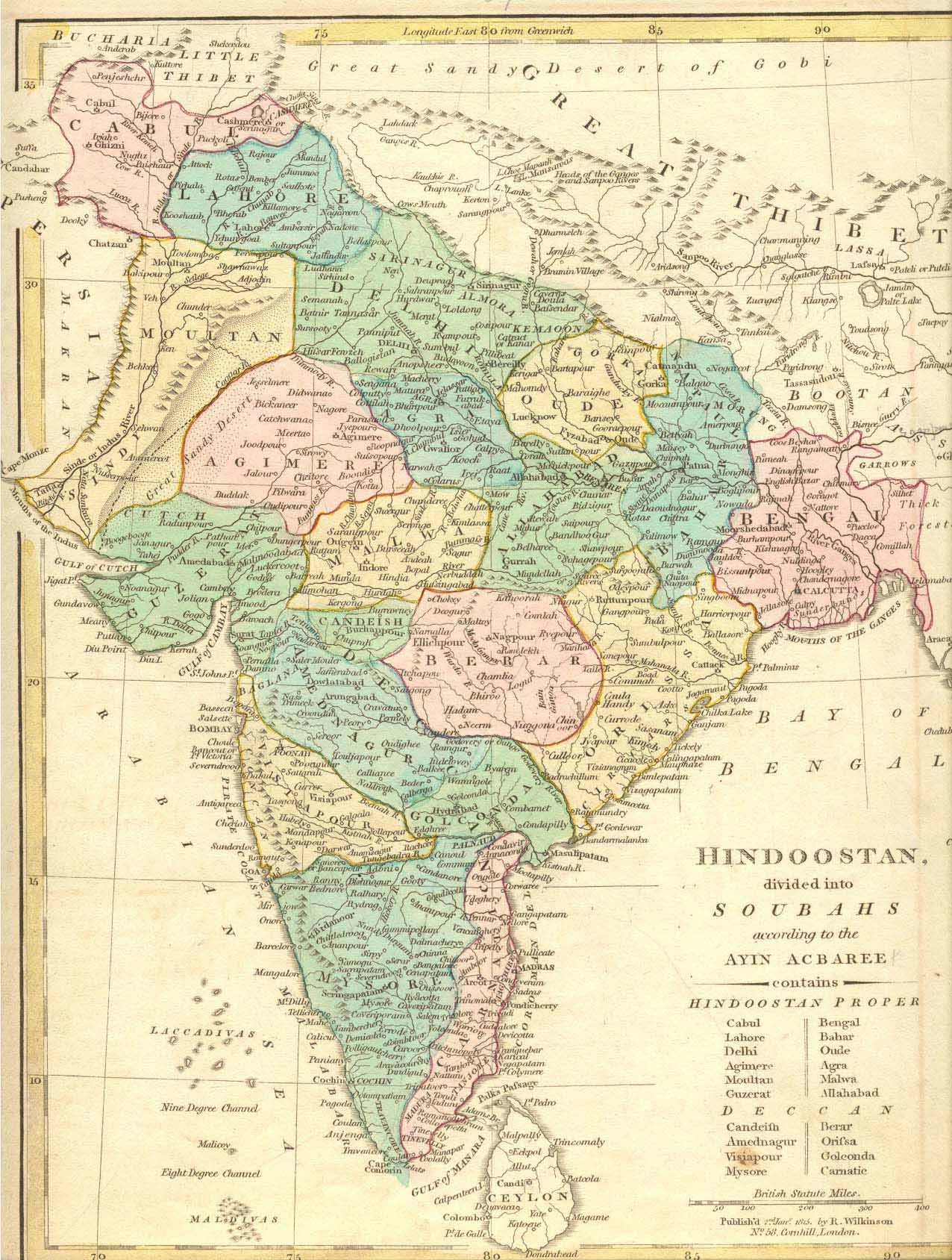
An 1815 British map of Hindustan (India) divided into subahs according to the Ain-i-Akbari.

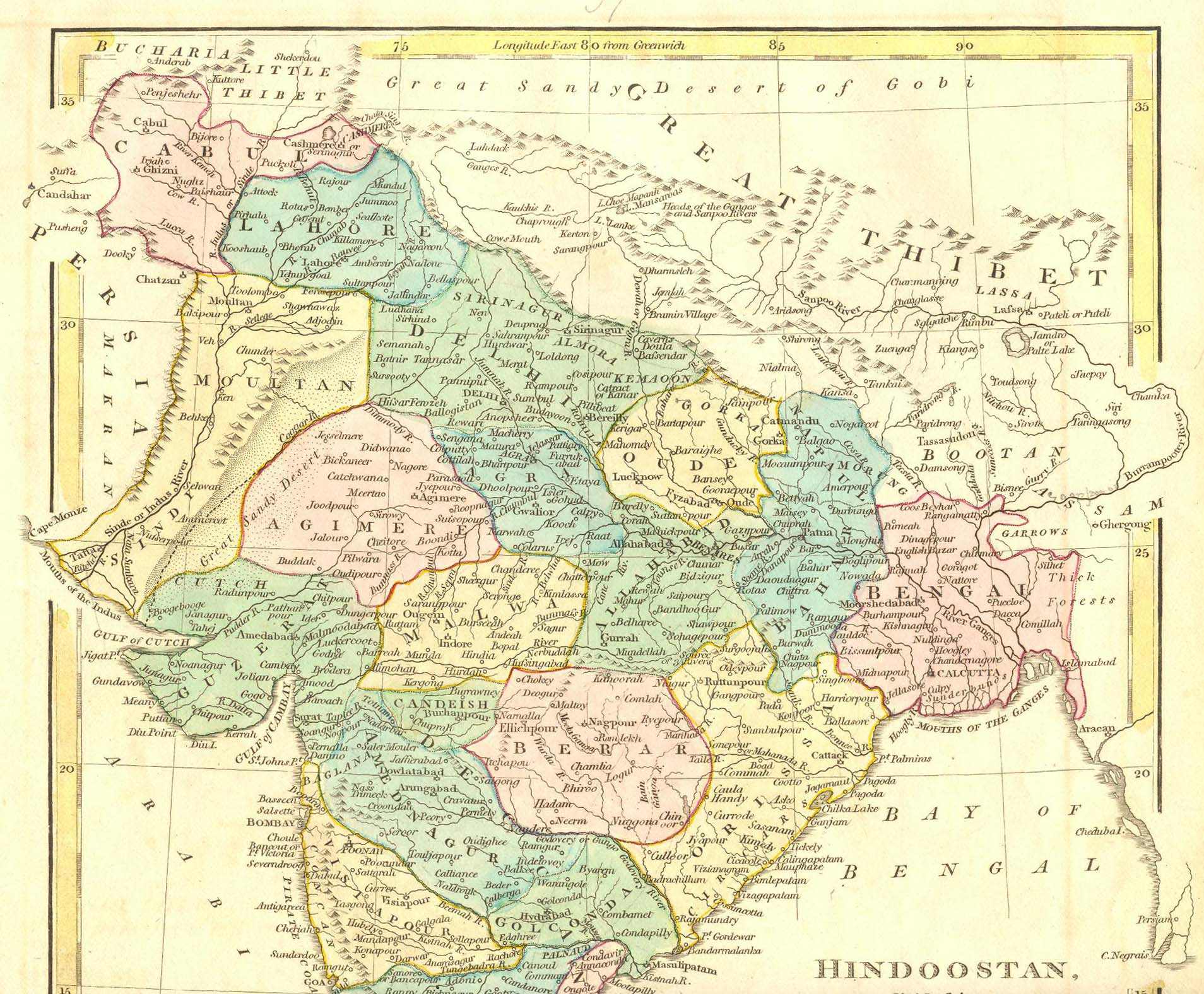
The upper half of an 1815 British map of Hindustan (India) divided into subahs, showing northern India.

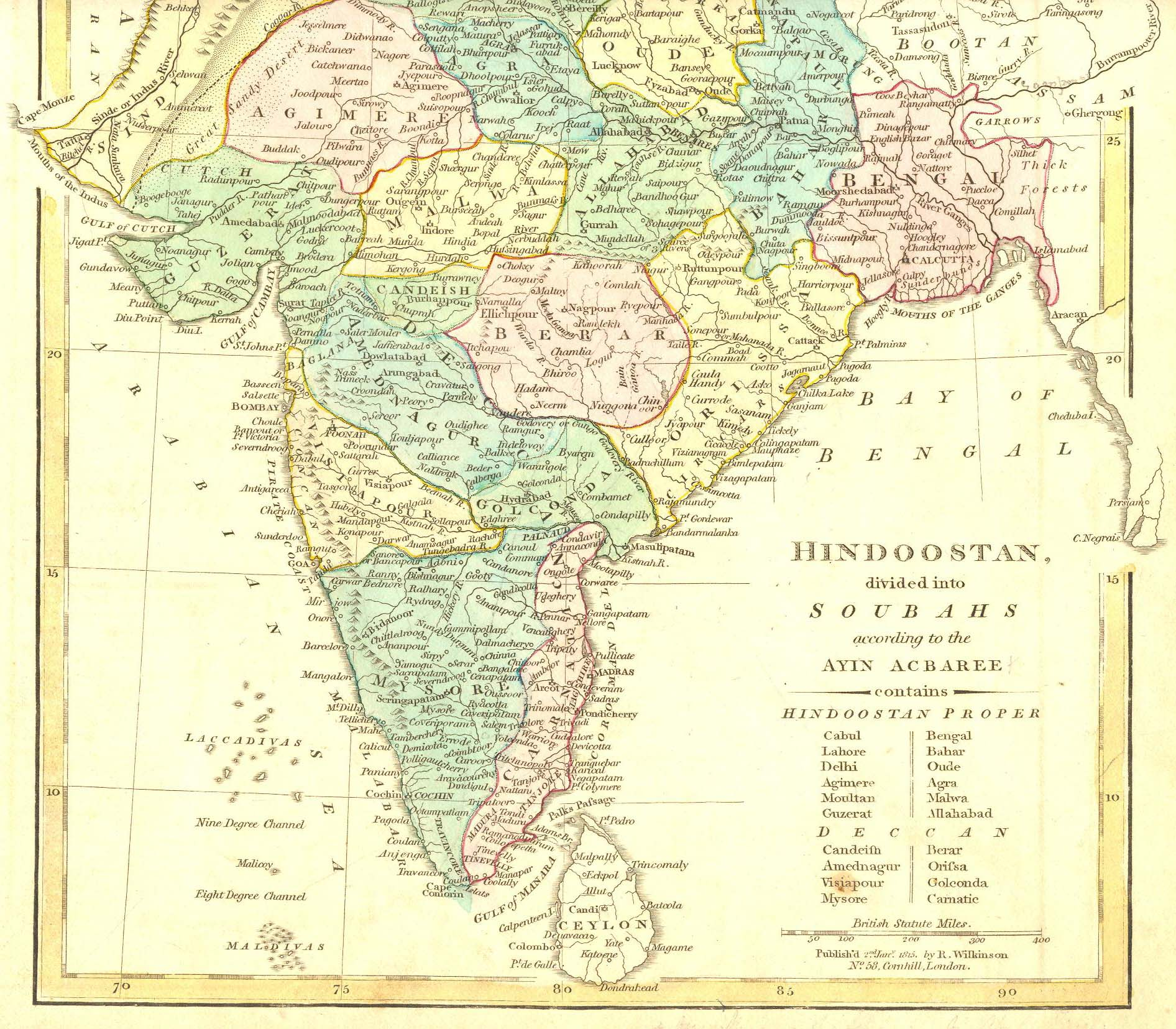
The lower half of an 1815 British map of Hindustan (India) divided into subahs, showing southern India.

The Ain-i-Akbari is the third volume of the Akbarnama containing information on Akbar's reign in the form of administrative reports, similar to a gazetteer. In Blochmann's explanation, "it contains the 'āīn' (i.e. mode of governing) of Emperor Akbar, and is the administrative report and statistical return of his government as it was about 1590."

The Ain-i-Akbari is divided into five books. The first book called Manzil-Abadi deals with the imperial household and its maintenance, and the second called sipah-abadi, with the servants of the emperor, military and civil services. The third entitled mulk-abadi teals with imperial administration, containing judiciary and executive regulations. The fourth contains information on Hindu philosophy, science, social customs, and literature. The fifth contains sayings of Akbar, along with an account of the ancestry and biography of the author.

== Volumes ==
=== Volume 1: Manzil-Abadi ===
The Manzil-Abadi ("place establishment") volume has a total of 90 'Ain' or Regulations dealing with and describing the different segments of administration and occupations at that time. The various ains include the one on the imperial mint, its workmen and their process of refining and extracting gold and silver, the dirham and the dinar etc. There are also portions dedicated to the Imperial Harem (Ain 15), the royal seals (Ain 20), the imperial kitchen (Ain 23), and its recipes and the rules relating to the days of abstinence (Ain 26). The volume contains a detailed description of items such as fruits, vegetables, perfumes, carpets, etc., and also of art and painting. Ain-i-Akbari is an excellent resource for information on the maintenance of the Mughal army during Akbar's reign. Ain 35 deals with the use and maintenance of artillery, the upkeep and branding of royal horses, camels, mules and elephants, and also describes the details of the food given to animals. The volume also has regulations pertaining to laborers' wages, housebuilding estimates, etc.

=== Volume 2: Sipah-Abadi ===
The Sipah-Abadi ("military establishment") volume describes the treatment of the servants of the throne, the military and civil services, and the attendants at the court, who with their literary genius or musical skill received a great deal of encouragement from the emperor and similarly commended the high value of their work. It also gives a detailed account of the functioning of the Mansabdari System.

=== Volume 3: Mulk-Abadi ===
The Mulk-Abadi ("government establishment") volume is entirely devoted to regulations for the judicial and executive departments, the establishment of a new and more practical era, the survey of the land, the tribal divisions, and the rent-roll of the finance minister. The brilliant land revenue collection during the Mughal times organized by Akbar with Raja Todar Mal, called Raja Todar Mal's Bandobast is explained in detail in this 4th book of the Ain-I-Akbari. A detailed account on the administration, land revenue collection and tribal divisions of each of the 15 Subhas/Subas, or provinces of Akbar's empire is given.

=== Volume 4 (law and social conditions) ===
The fourth book describes the social condition and literary activity, especially in philosophy and law, of the Hindus, who form the bulk of the population, and in whose political advancement the emperor saw the guarantee of the stability of his realm. There are also a few chapters on the foreign invaders of India, on distinguished travelers, and on Muslim saints and the sects to which they belong.

=== Volume 5 (things spoken and done by Emperor Akbar) ===
The fifth book contains moral sentences and epigrammatical sayings, observations, and rules of wisdom of the emperor collected by Abu'l Fazl.

== Ain-i-Akbari by Syed Ahmad Khan ==
In 1855, Sir Syed Ahmad Khan finished his scholarly, well-researched and illustrated edition of Abul Fazl's Ai'n-e Akbari, that itself was an extraordinarily difficult book. Having finished the work to his satisfaction, he brought it to Mirza Asadullah Khan Ghalib believing that he would appreciate his labours. He approached the great Ghalib to write a taqriz (in the convention of the times, a laudatory foreword) for it. Ghalib obliged but wrote a short Persian poem castigating the Ai'n-e Akbari and by implication, the imperial, sumptuous, literate and learned Mughal culture of which it was a product. Ghalib practically reprimanded Syed Ahmad Khan for wasting his talent on 'dead things' and lavished praise on the "sahibs of England" who at that time held all the a’ins in this world.

Ghalib seemed to be acutely aware of changes in world polity due to the actions of the great powers, especially in Indian polity. Syed Ahmad might well have been piqued at Ghalib's admonitions, but realised the forces that impinged the publication.

Sir Syed Ahmad Khan gave up an active interest in history and archaeology. Although he did edit another two historical texts over the next few years, neither of them bore the scope of the Ai'n: a vast and triumphant document on the governance of Akbar.

== Notable Ains ==
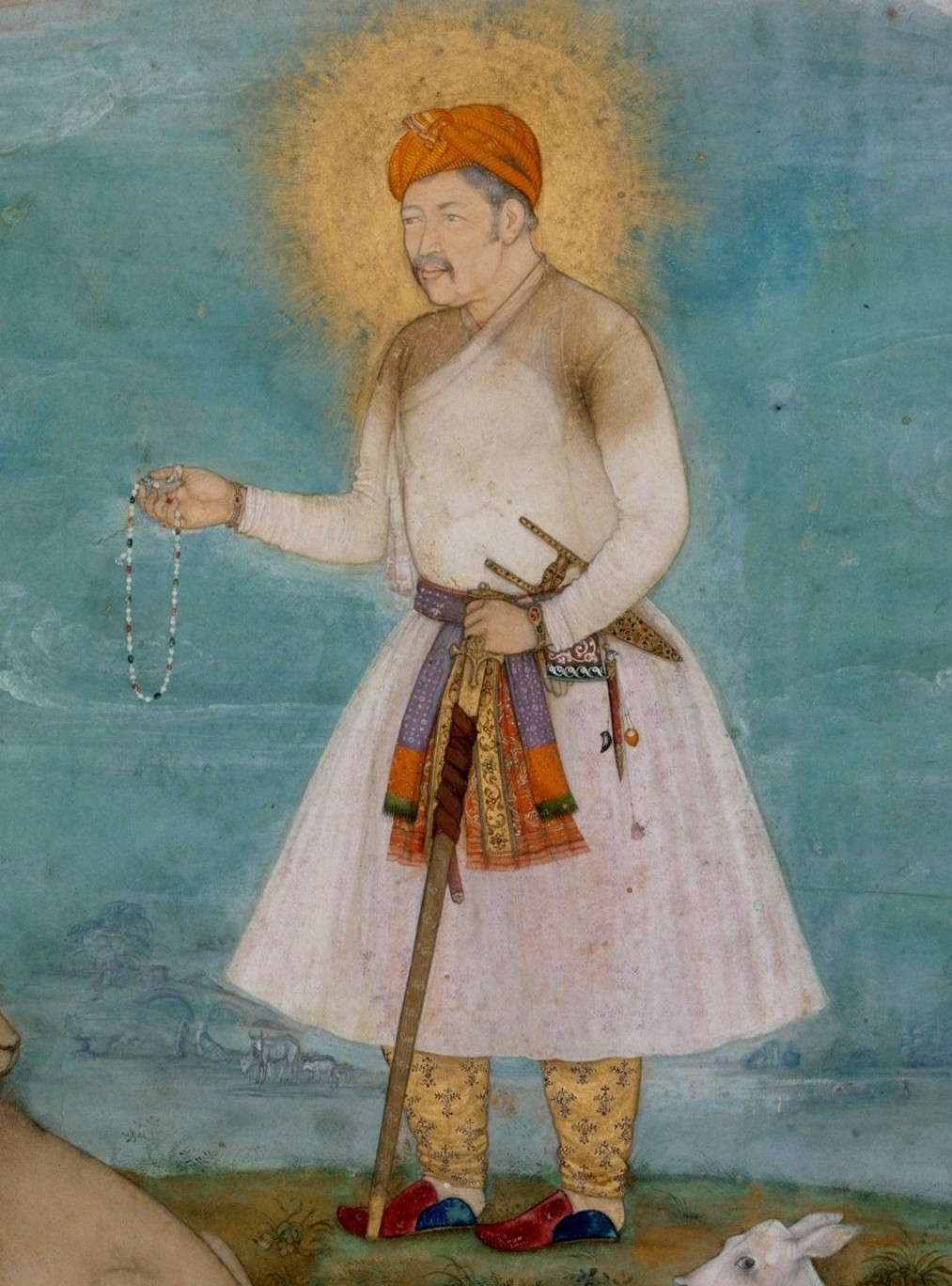
A painting of Mughal Emperor Akbar.

Mughal painting of a man, possibly Emperor Babur, reading a book.

The Mustard of Man (Ain 76 Book 1)
The business which Akbar Majesty transacts is multifarious. A large number of men were appointed on the days assembly of expenditure was announced. Their merits are inquired into and the coin of knowledge passes the current. Some pray his majesty to remove religious doubt; other again seek his advice for settling a worldly matter; other want medicines for their cure. Like these many other requests were made. The salaries of large number of men from Iran, Turkey, Europe, Hindustan, and Kashmir are fixed in a manner described below, and the men themselves are taken before His Majesty by the paymasters. Formerly it had been custom for man to come with horses and accoutrements; but now only men appointed to the post of Ahadi were allowed to bring horses. The salary is proposed by the officer who bring them, which is then increased or decreased, though it is generally increased; for the market of His Majesty is never dull. The number of men brought before His Majesty depends on the number of men that are available. Every Monday all such horsemen are mustered as were left from the preceding week. With the view of increasing the army and the zeal of officers, His Majesty gives a present of two dams for each horsemen to each person who brings horsemen.

Regulation regarding education (Ain 25 Book 2)
His Majesty orders that every school boy must learn to write the letters of the alphabet first and then learn to trace their several forms. He ought to learn the shape and name of each letter, which may be done on two days, after which the boy should proceed to write joined letter. They may be practiced for a week after which boy should learn some prose and poetry by heart, and then commit to memory some verses to the praise of God, or moral sentences, each written separately. Care is to be taken that he learns everything by himself but the teacher must assist him a little.

== Translations ==
Ain-i-Akbari was one of the first Persian texts to be translated into the English language. The original Persian text was translated into English in three volumes. The first volume, translated by German orientalist Heinrich Blochmann (1873) consisted of Books I and II. The second volume, translated by Col. Henry Sullivan Jarrett (1891), contained Book III, and the remaining volume, also translated by Jarrett (1896), Books IV and V. These three volumes were published by the Asiatic Society of Calcutta as a part of their Bibliotheca Indica series.

== See also ==
- Mughal Karkhanas
- Mughal Empire
- Qutni
