= Kurta =

Loose shirt or tunic worn traditionally in South Asia

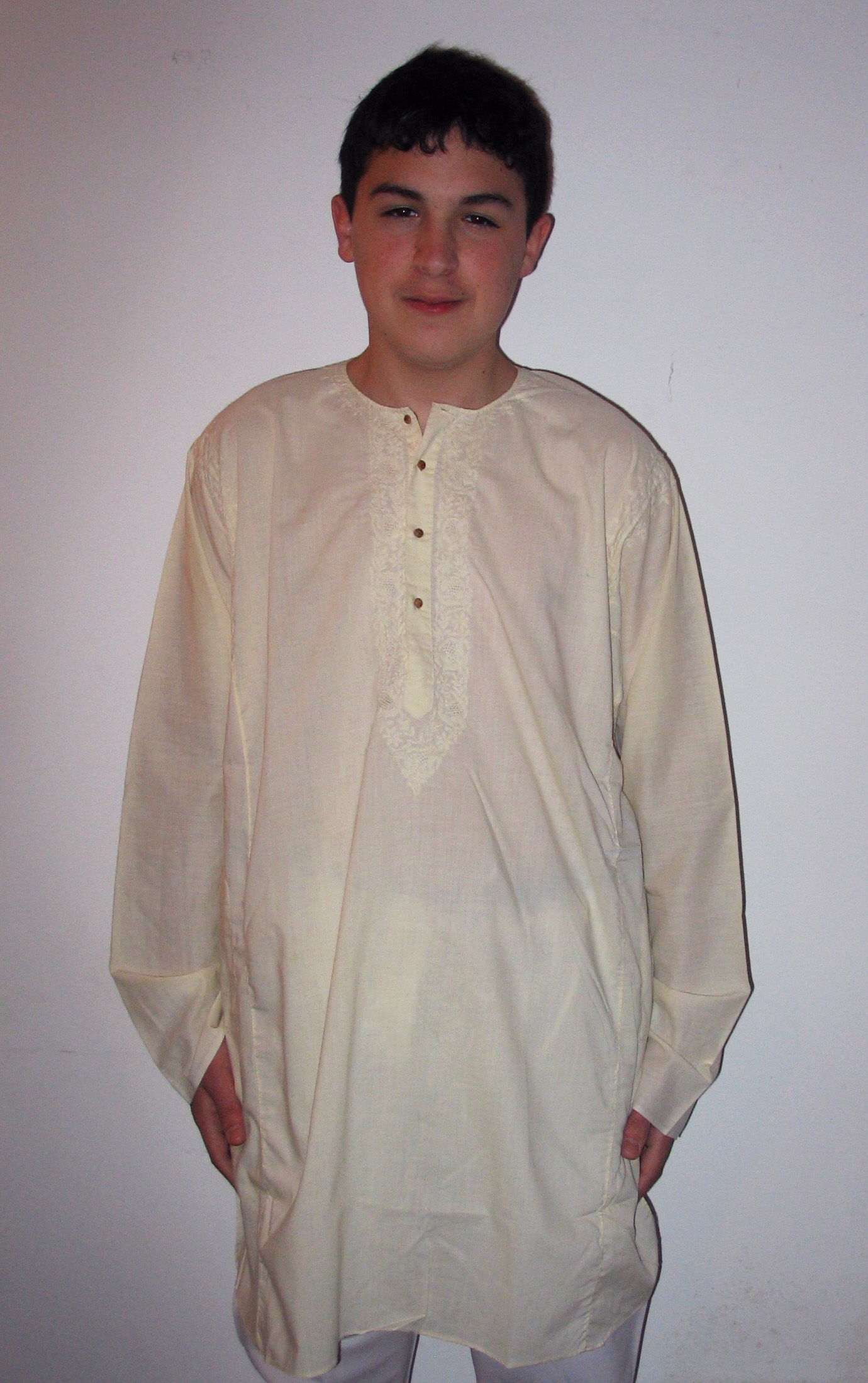
A traditional cotton kurta with wooden cuff-links-style buttons, centre placket opening with chikan, a style of embroidery from Lucknow, India

A kurta is a loose collarless shirt or tunic worn in many regions of South Asia, and now also worn around the world. Tracing its roots to Central Asian nomadic tunics, or upper body garments, of the late-ancient- or early-medieval era, the kurta has evolved stylistically over the centuries, especially in South Asia, as a garment for everyday wear as well as for formal occasions.

The kurta is traditionally made of cotton or silk. It is worn plain or with embroidered decoration, such as chikan; and it can be loose or tight in the torso, typically falling either just above or somewhere below the knees of the wearer. The front and back of a traditional kurta are made of rectangular pieces, and its side-seams are left open at the bottom, up to varying lengths, to enable ease of movement.

The sleeves of a traditional kurta fall to the wrist without narrowing, the ends hemmed but not cuffed; the kurta can be worn by both men and women; it is traditionally collarless, though standing collars are increasingly popular. Kurtas are traditionally worn over ordinary pajamas, loose shalwars, or churidars. Among urban youth, kurtas are being increasingly worn over jeans, not only in South Asia, but also in the South Asian diaspora, both the recently established, and the longstanding. Young women and girls in urban areas are increasingly wearing kurtis, which are short hip-length kurtas, with jeans or leggings, in addition to more traditional lower-body garments.

== Etymology ==
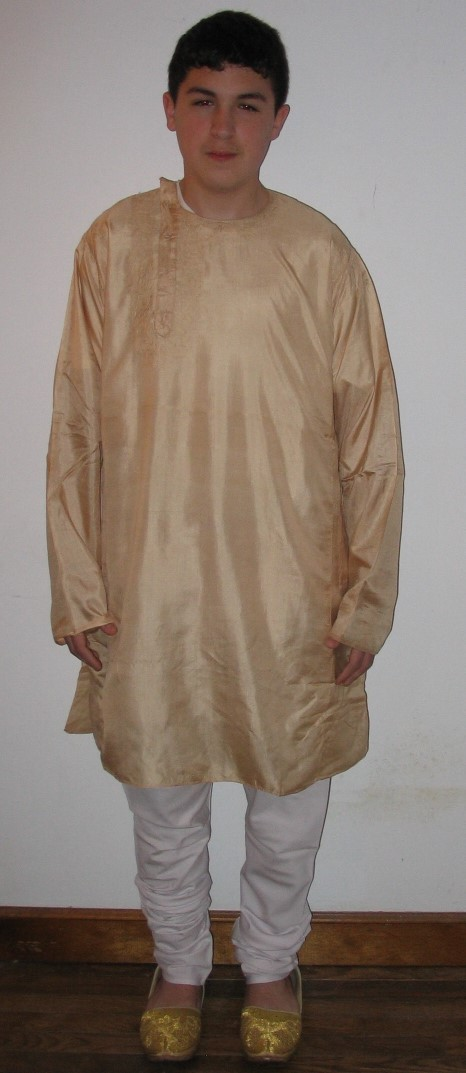
A silk kurta worn with churidar and decorative mojari sandals.

- According to the Oxford Dictionary of English,
  kurta (n): A loose collarless shirt worn by people from South Asia, usually with a salwar, churidars, or pyjama. From Urdu and Persian kurtah.
- According to the Oxford English Dictionary (online, subscription required), the first use of kurta in English is attributed to W.G. Lawrence in T. E. Lawrence, Home Letters, 1913, "Me in a dhoti khurta, White Indian clothes."
- According to Cannon and Kay's The Persian Contributions to the English Language: A Historical Dictionary, 2001,
  kurta, n. (Ogilby 1673: 50) Cloth., var. khurta, kurtha + 1 [Persian. a tunic, waistcoat, jacket & Hindi & Urdu ( < Persian.)] A loose shirt or tunic worn by Persian men and now esp. by Indians; a woman's dress resembling the man's kurta, popular in the West.
- According to Platt's A Dictionary of Urdu, Classical Hindi, and English, 1884, online, updated 2015,
  Persian کرته kurta, s.m. A shirt worn outside the drawers; a frock, a kind of tunic; a waistcoat or jacket.
- According to McGregor's Oxford Hindi-English Dictionary:
  कुरता kurtā: (Persian. masculine), a collarless shirt
- According to Winer's Dictionary of the English/Creole of Trinidad & Tobago: On Historical Principles, 2009,
  kurti, kurtee n A traditional form of Indian woman's long loose-fitting tunic, with long sleeves. /kurti/ * Usually the Kurti was longer than men's Kurta, for sometimes it reached down [past] the knees. (Raghoo 1984:3) * She used to wear long dress and kurtee and tie a handkerchief on her head. (Deen 1994:167)
- According to Steingass's A Comprehensive Persian-English Dictionary, 1892 (updated 2007)
  کرته kurta, A tunic, waistcoat, jacket; a long loose-skirted under-gown or shirt; a shirt. کرتی kurtī, A waistcoat for women, a short bodice reaching to the hips, with very short, if any sleeves, open under the throat; a soldier's jacket.
  Arabic قرطق qurt̤aq (Persian. كرته kurta), A kind of garment. Arabic قرطقة qartaqat (v.n. of قرطق), Putting the garment qurt̤aq on (any person).

== History ==
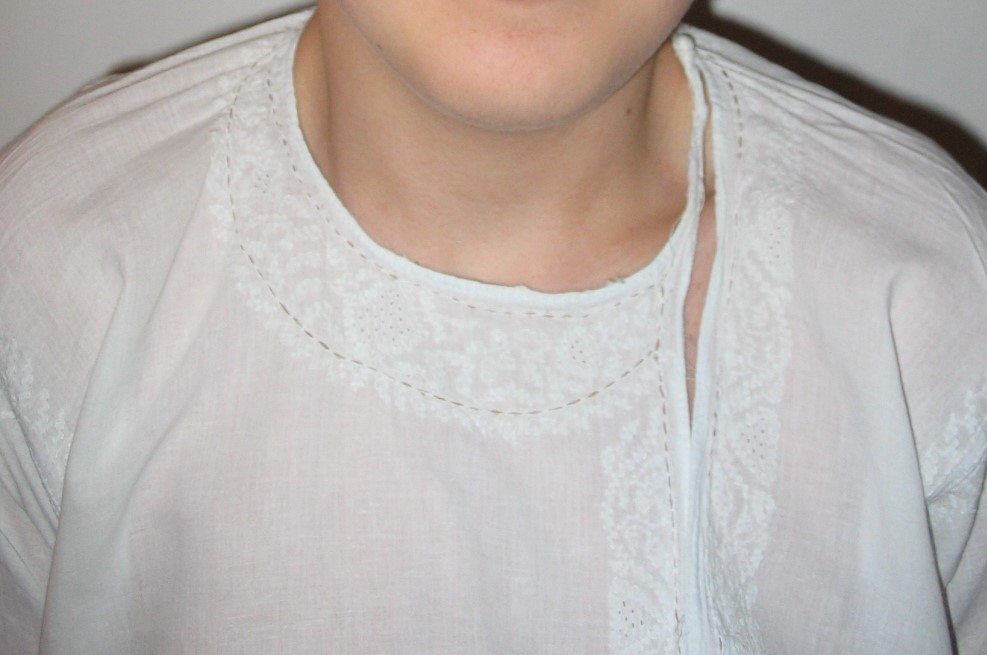
Close up of knot-and-loop button for a kurta with opening off the left shoulder, a relic of the qaba of the Ghaznavid period.

According to author Roshen Alkazi, stitched (i.e. cut and sewn) attire came to South Asia from Central Asia. There was a trickle during the Scythian/Parthian/Kushan invasions of the late ancient period. with Mahmud of Ghazni, the floodgates opening with the Muslim conquests of the late 12th century, until the kurta became an item of common attire during the early modern era.

According to Alkazi:

...In the Ghaznavid period, we have only one clear visual reference to their actual costume, those worn by the Mamluk (slave) palace guards of Mahmud of Ghazni, in the wall paintings of Lashkari Bazaar in Afghanistan. They wear the qaba made of rich patterned textiles. This was a mid-calf length tunic with long narrow sleeves and tiraz. The opening is from right to left and has a small loop for closing it higher at the left shoulder. This closing at the left shoulder was one of the earliest forms of neck closing and a relic of this is still seen in the Russian tunic and in the contemporary kurtas used in certain parts of India, both of which close at the left shoulder. (p 467)

== Styles ==
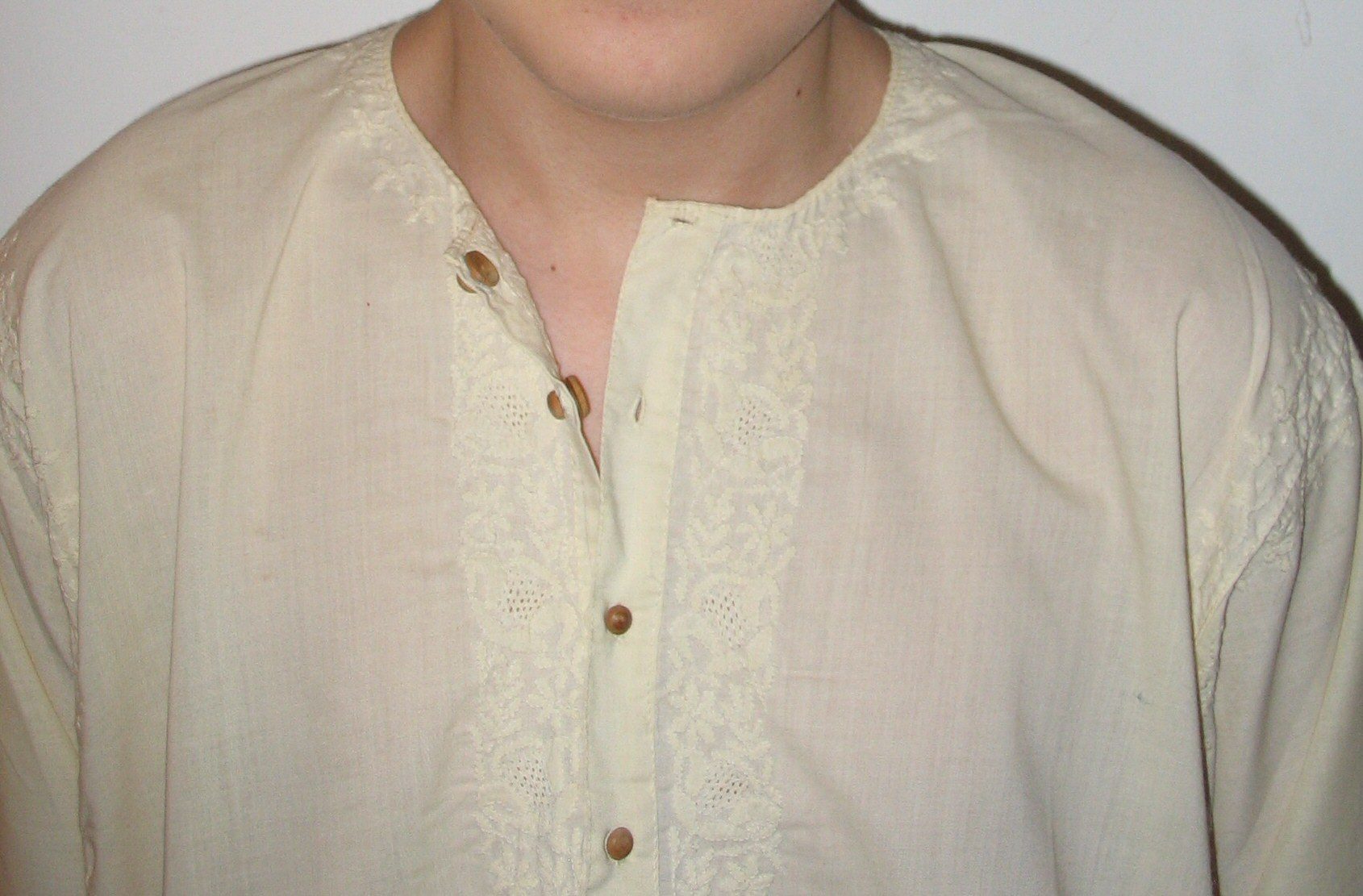
Close up of front opening kurta with plackets and cuff links

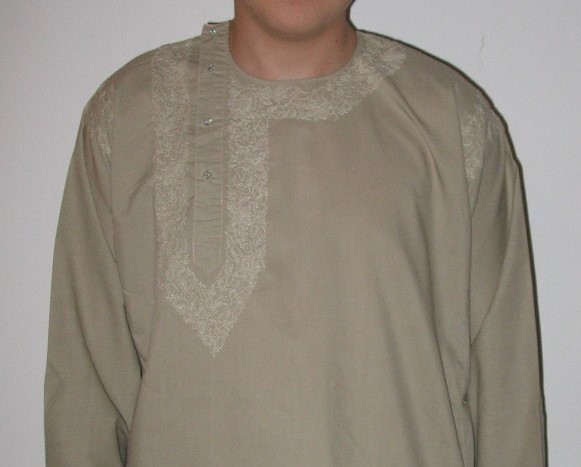
A formal-wear kurta with off-centre placket opening and chikan embroidery

A traditional kurta is composed of rectangular fabric pieces with perhaps a few gusset inserts, and is cut so as to leave no waste fabric. The cut is usually simple, although decorative treatments can be elaborate.

The sleeves of a traditional kurta fall straight to the wrist; they do not narrow, as do many Western-cut sleeves. Sleeves are not cuffed, just hemmed and decorated.

The front and back pieces of a simple kurta are also rectangular. The side seams are left open for 6-12 inches above the hem, also referred to as the chāk, which gives the wearer some ease of movement. (Note: chāk derives from the Persian "چاك ćāk, Fissure, cleft, rent, slit, a narrow opening intentionally left in clothes)."

The kurta usually opens in the front; some styles, however, button at the shoulder seam. The front opening is often a hemmed slit in the fabric, tied or buttoned at the top; some kurtas, however, have plackets rather than slits. The opening may be centered on the chest, or positioned off center.

A traditional kurta does not have a collar. Modern variants may feature stand-up collars of the type known to tailors and seamstresses as "mandarin" collars. These are the same sort of collars seen on achkans, sherwanis, and Nehru jackets.

== Material ==
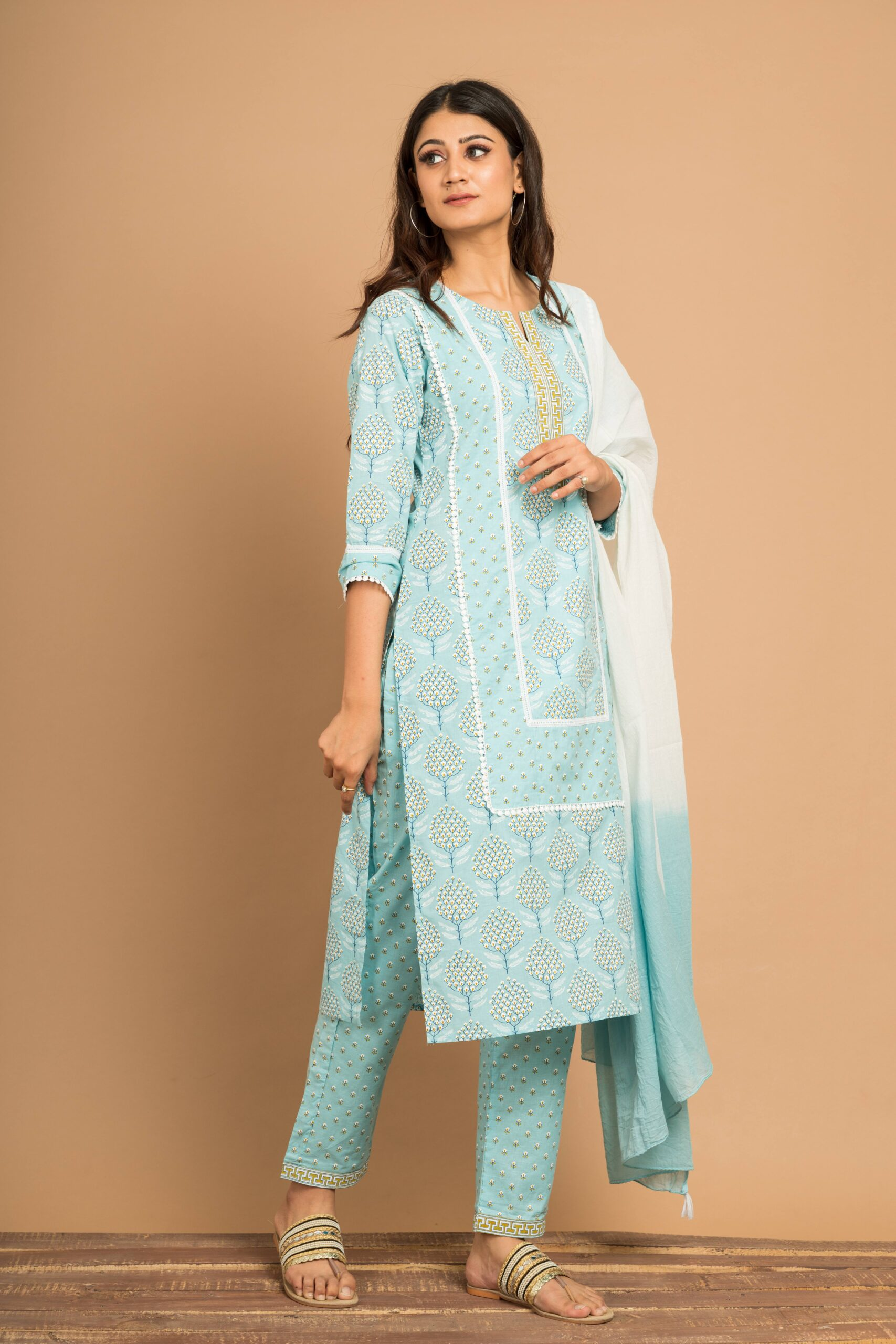
Cotton kurta worn over matching cotton pants.

Kurtas worn in the summer months are usually made of thin silk or cotton fabrics; winter season kurtas are made of thicker fabric such as wool or "Khadi silk", a thick, coarse, handspun and handwoven silk that may be mixed with other fibers. A very common fabric for the kurta pajama is linen, or a linen-cotton mix ideal for both summers and winters.

Kurtas are typically fastened with tasselled ties, cloth balls, and loops, or buttons. Buttons are often wood or plastic. Kurtas worn on formal occasions might feature decorative metal buttons, which are not sewn to the fabric, but, like cufflinks, are fastened into the cloth when needed. Such buttons can be decorated with jewels, enameling, and other traditional jewelers' techniques.

== Decoration ==
Tailors from the South Asia command a vast repertoire of methods, traditional and modern, for decorating fabric. It is likely that all of them have been used, at one time or another, to decorate kurtas. However, the most common decoration is embroidery. Many light summer kurtas feature Chikan embroidery, a specialty of Lucknow, around the hems and front opening. This embroidery is typically executed on light, semi-transparent fabric in a matching thread.

== Regional variants ==
Regional styles include the Bhopali, Hyderabadi, Lucknowi and straight-cut kurtas. The Bhopali kurta (taking its name from Bhopal) is a loose kurta with pleats at the waist, flowing like a skirt reaching midway between the knees and the ankles. (Note: The Bhopali kurta was popular with the local royal families and is believed to have been adopted from the dress of Turkey by Sultan Jehan Begum who reigned between 1901 and 1926 C.E.) The Hyderabadi kurta is named after the former royal state of Hyderabad and is a short top which sits around the waist, with a keyhole neck opening. It was popular with the local royal households. Traditionally, the Hyderabadi kurta was of white material, but modern versions can be of any colour. Over the kurta, some versions have net material, the combination of which is called jaali karga, worn by men and women. The traditional Lucknowi kurta can either be short or long, using as much as 12 yards of cloth. The traditional Lucknowi kurta styles have an overlapping panel. However, the term "Lucknowi kurta" now applies to the straight-cut kurta embroidered using local Chikan embroidery. Another style is the kali or kalidar kurta which is similar to a frock and has many panels. The kalidar kurta is made up of several geometrical pieces. It has two rectangular central panels in the back and the front. The kali kurta is worn by men and women.

The straight-cut traditional kurta is known as a panjabi in Bangladesh, West Bengal and Assam. Local embroidery designs give a regional outlook to the traditional kurta. In Assam, the Panjabi is worn with a scarf (Gamosa) using local prints. Other designs include Bengali Kantha embroidery; Multani crocheted designs of Multan (Punjab, Pakistan); the Phulkari kurta using the Phulkari embroidery of the Punjab region; Bandhani tye-dyeing of the Cholistan Desert; Delhi style kurtas which include the wooden beaded kurta and a kurta heavily laden with embroidery;

Sindhi kurtas called Pehran/Pehriyan in Sindhi are made out of many Sindhi embroideries like Kacha, Pakka, Hurmuch, Muka, Pani etc, Sindhi kurtas are also made of applique called "Tuk ja Kurta" Sindhi kurtas utilise mirrors and the local art of bandhani (creating patterned textiles by resisting parts of a fabric by tying knots on it before it is dyed). Sindhi kurtas are worn by both men and women, the female kurtas are called "Padhri" which are tied at either side of shoulder are heavily embroidered with heavy embellishments like mirrorwork, pompoms (phundra), sequins, cowries, shells, beads and buttons, the male kurtas are called Pehran or Pehriyan which are embroidered as well, and are collarless having either side neck or center necks.

Traditional Punjabi kurta of the Punjab region is wide and falls to the knees and is cut straight. The modern version of the regional kurta is the Muktsari kurta which originates from Muktsar in Punjab. This modern Punjabi kurta is famous for its slim-fitting cuts and smart fit designs. It is very popular among young politicians.

Kurta styles
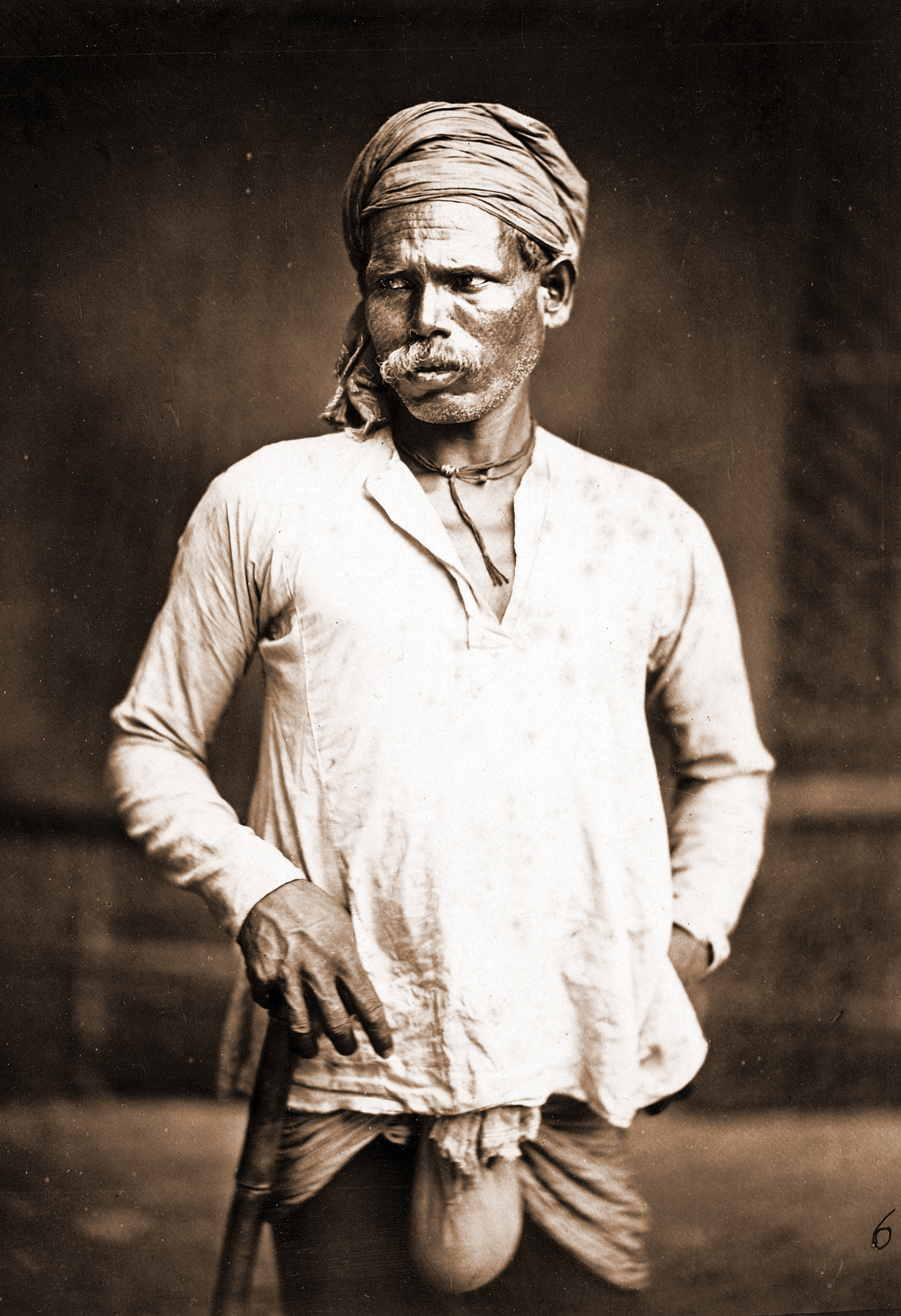
A Dom man, East Bengal (Bangladesh), 1860

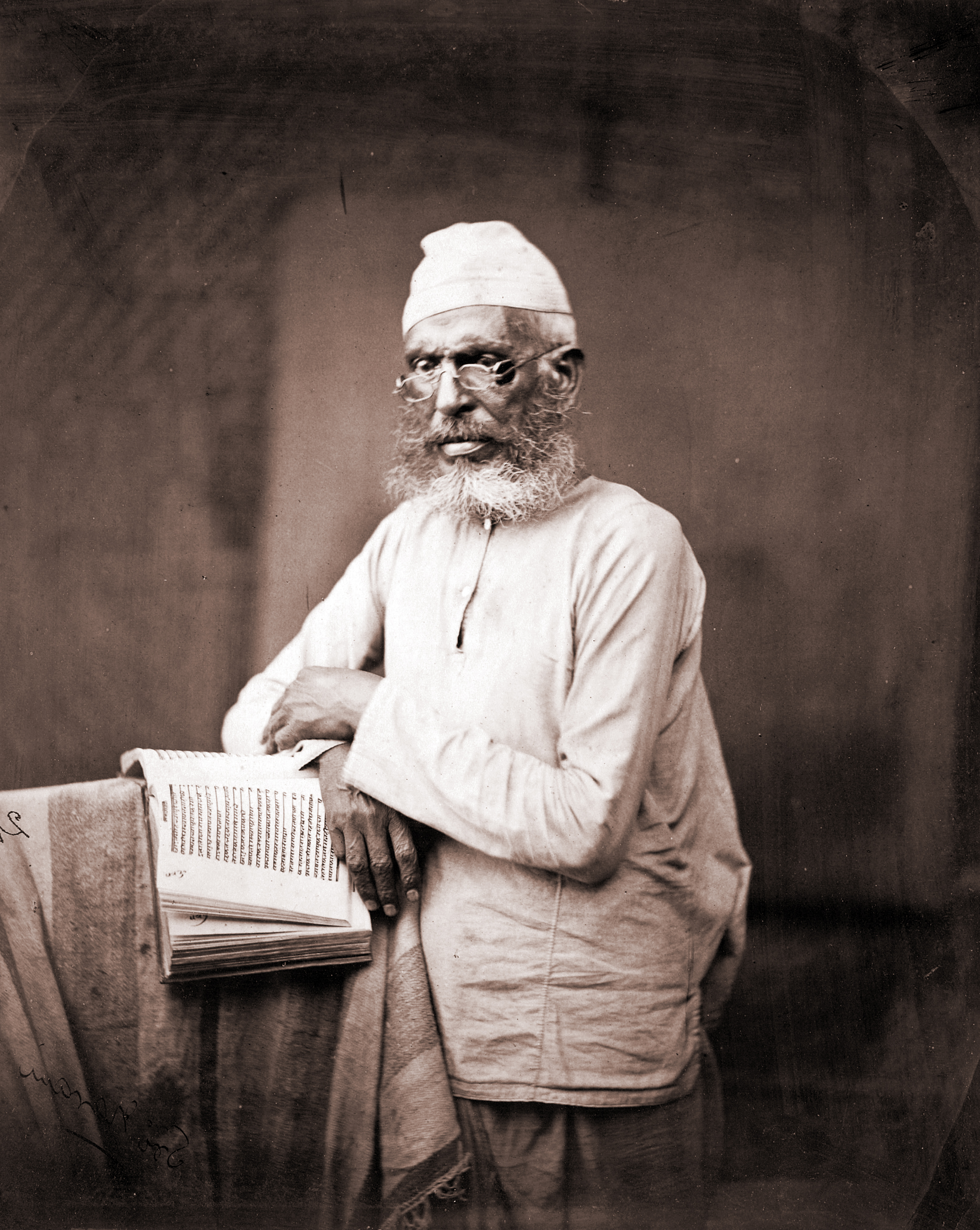
Muslim scholar, East Bengal (Bangladesh), 1860

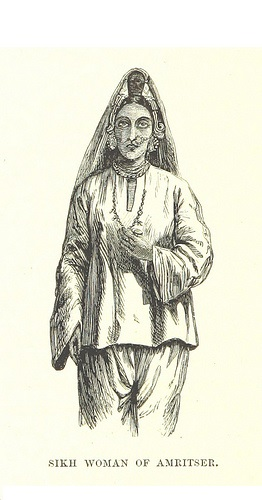
Punjabi woman in short kurta 1874

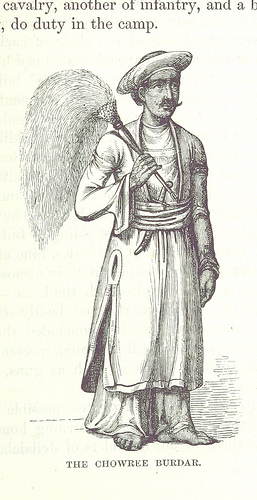
Man in kurta, Ferozepur, 1845

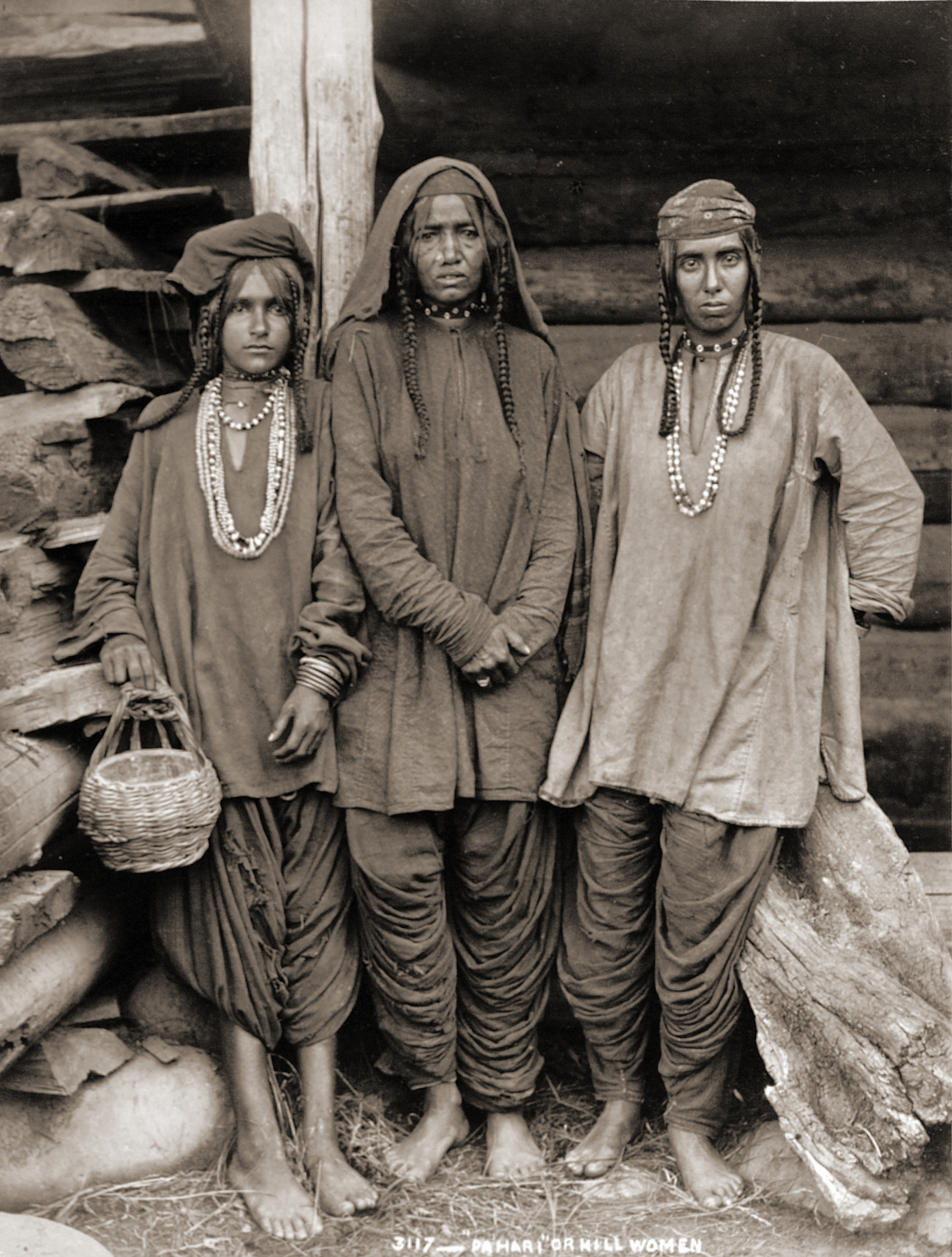
Pahari (Hill) women, Kashmir, 1890

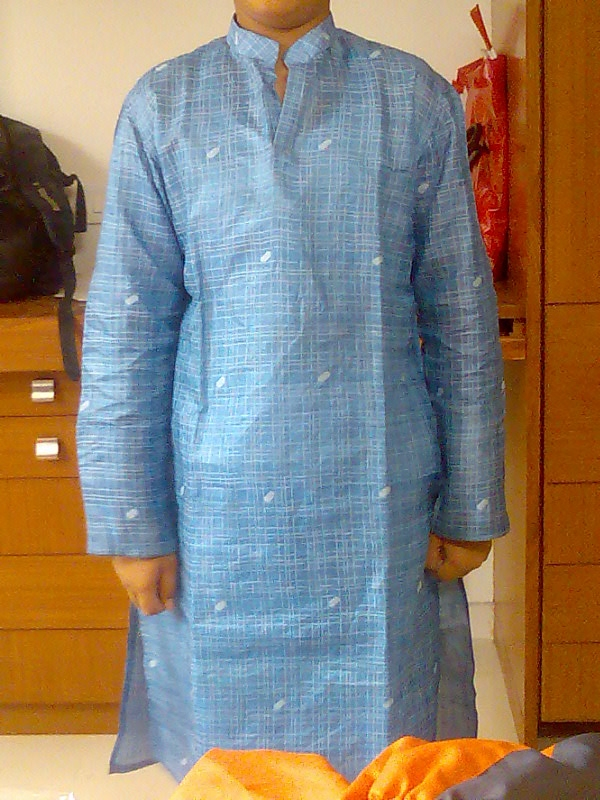
A blue khadi kurta

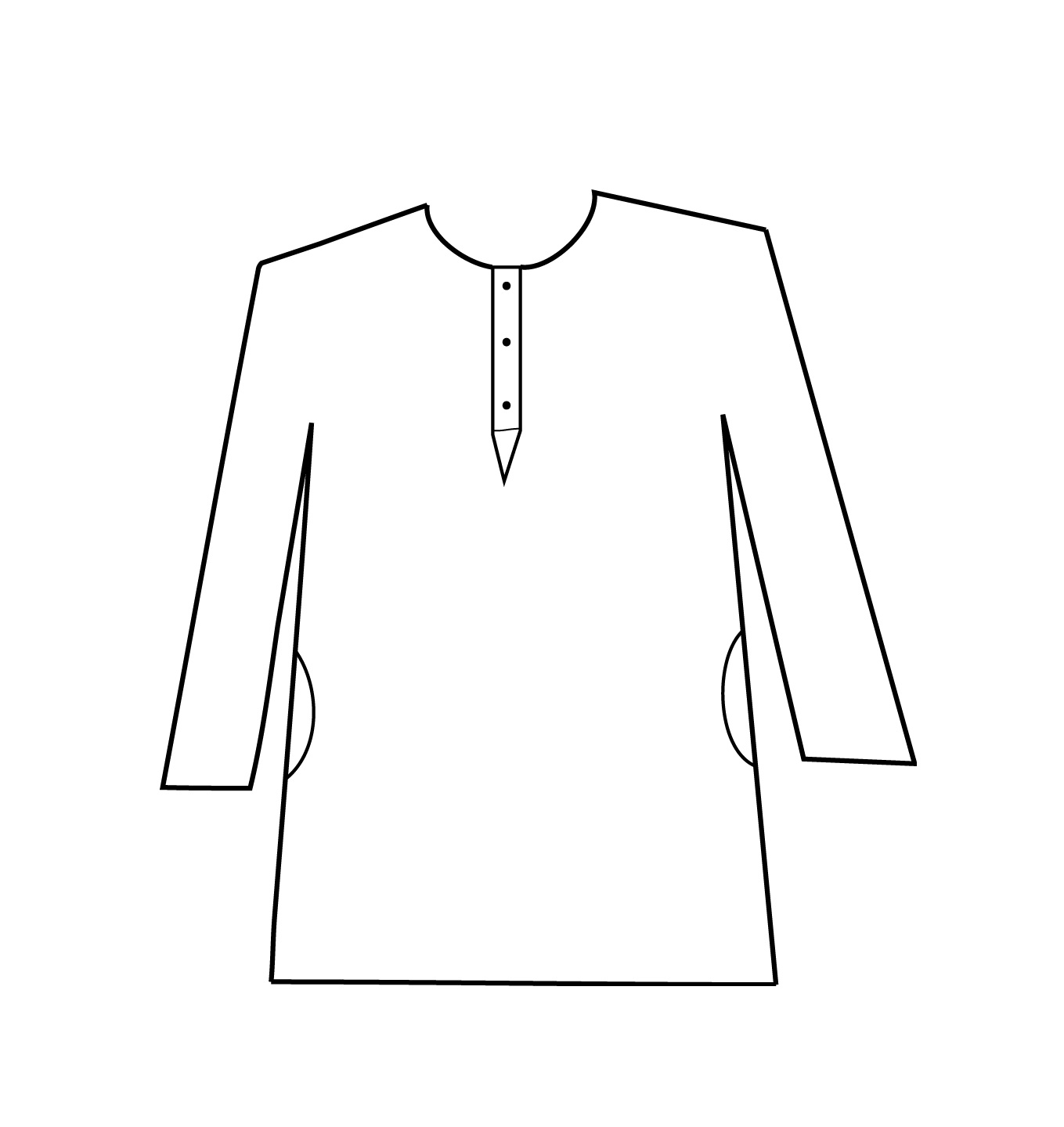
Men's kurta

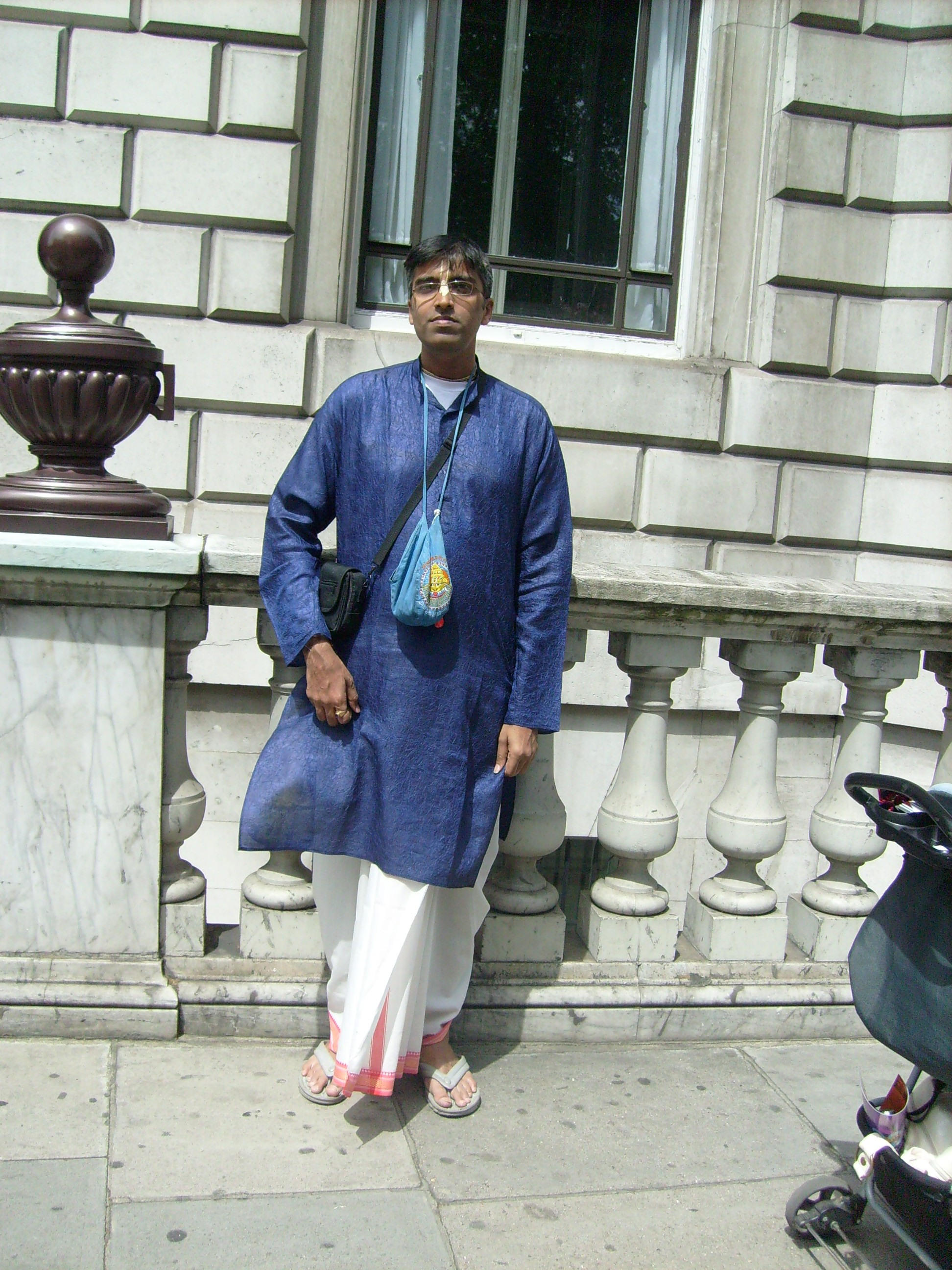
Man in dhoti kurta

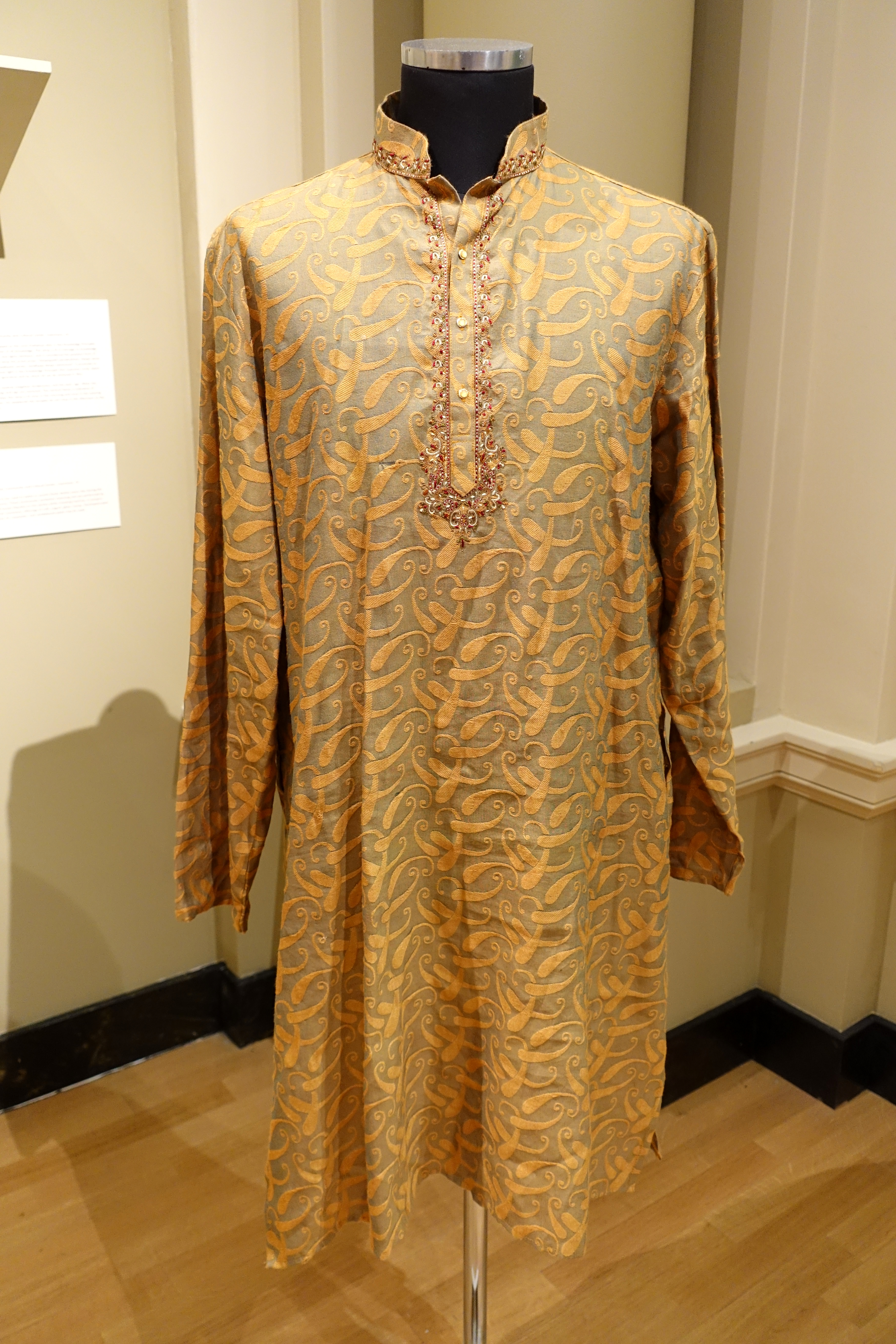
Kurta, India, 20th century, cotton blend - Saint Ignatius Church, San Francisco, CA

=== Jeans and straight-cut kurta ===
Kurtas are often worn with jeans. Women sometimes wear kurtas as blouses, usually over jeans pants. Jeans are sometimes preferred over pajamas or leggings as they are more durable for rough use. Most colours of kurtas match with blue jeans. In 2014, an Indian family court in Mumbai ruled that a husband objecting to his wife wearing a kurta and jeans and forcing her to wear a sari amounts to cruelty inflicted by the husband and can be a ground to seek divorce. The wife was thus granted a divorce on the ground of cruelty as defined under section 27(1)(d) of Special Marriage Act, 1954.

=== Leggings and straight cut kurta ===
Ladies' kurtas/blouses, along with leggings, are most popular in South Asia, and the community from South Asia in Singapore and Malaysia.

=== Kurti ===
In modern usage, a short kurta for women is referred to as the kurti. However, traditionally, the kurti refers to waistcoats, jackets and blouses which sit above the waist without side slits, and are believed to have descended from the tunic of the Shunga period (2nd century B.C.). Kurtis are typically much shorter than the traditional garments and made with lighter materials, like those used in sewing kameez.

== See also ==
- Barong Tagalog (influenced from Kurta)
- Angarkha
- Áo dài
- Jama (coat)
- Khādī Development and Village Industries Commission (Khadi Gramodyog)
- Thawb

== General and cited references ==
- Bhandari, Vandana (2004). Costume Textiles and Jewellery of India: Traditions in Rajasthan. London: Mercury Books. ISBN 1-904668-89-5. OCLC 58481881. 192 pages.
- Tarlo, Emma (1996). Clothing Matters: Dress and Identity in India. Chicago: University of Chicago Press. ISBN 0-226-78976-4. OCLC 32779537. 382 pages.
