= Sindhi embroidery =

Traditional needlework of Sindh

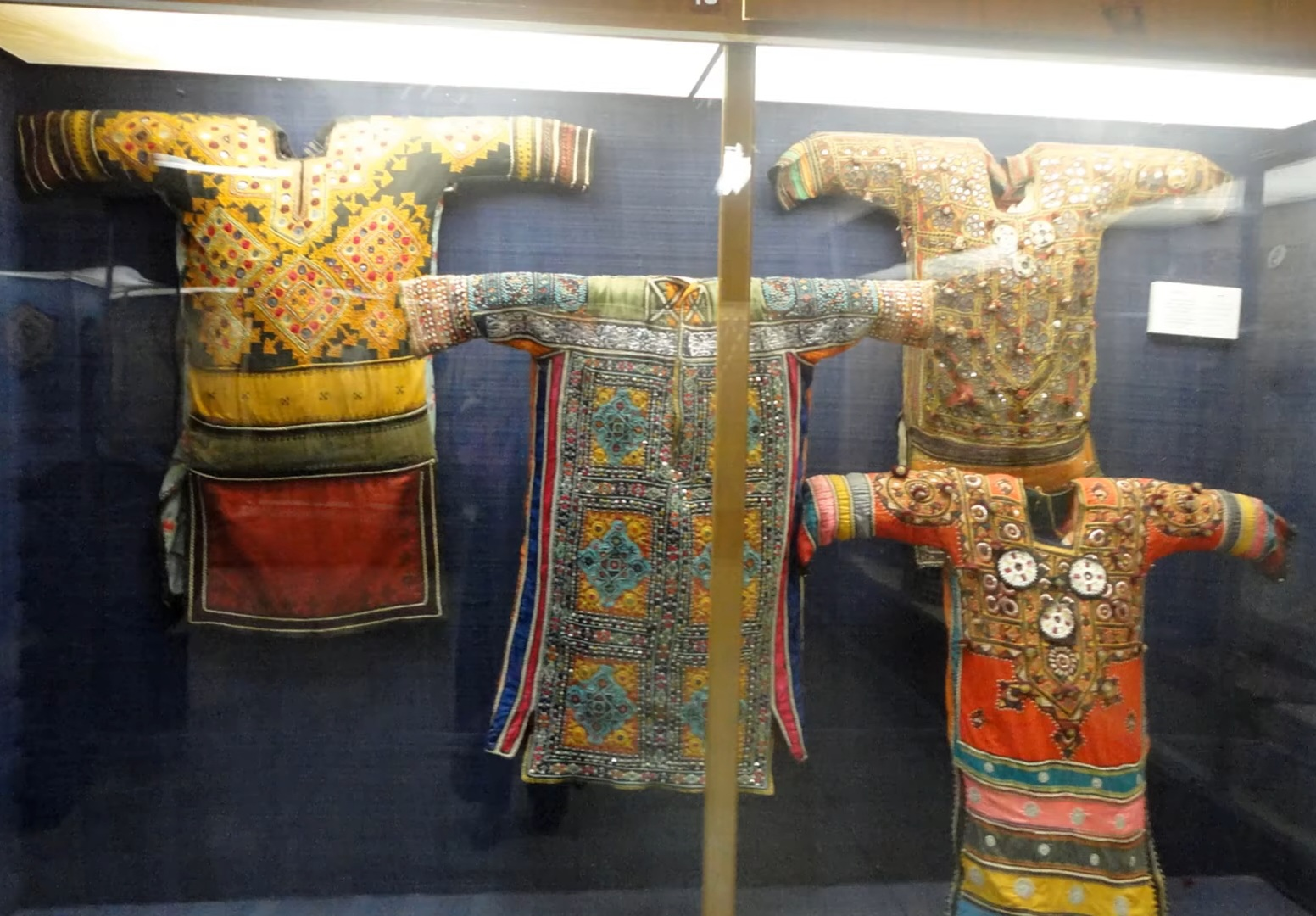
Traditional Sindhi-embroidered Chola with (gaj) front, from Lower Sindh "Larr, Kohistan, Lasbelo and Thar regions" displayed in a museum.

Sindhi embroidery (Sindhi: سنڌي ٿرت) comes from the arid province of Sindh in southern Pakistan, which has always been famed for its embroidery.

== Background ==
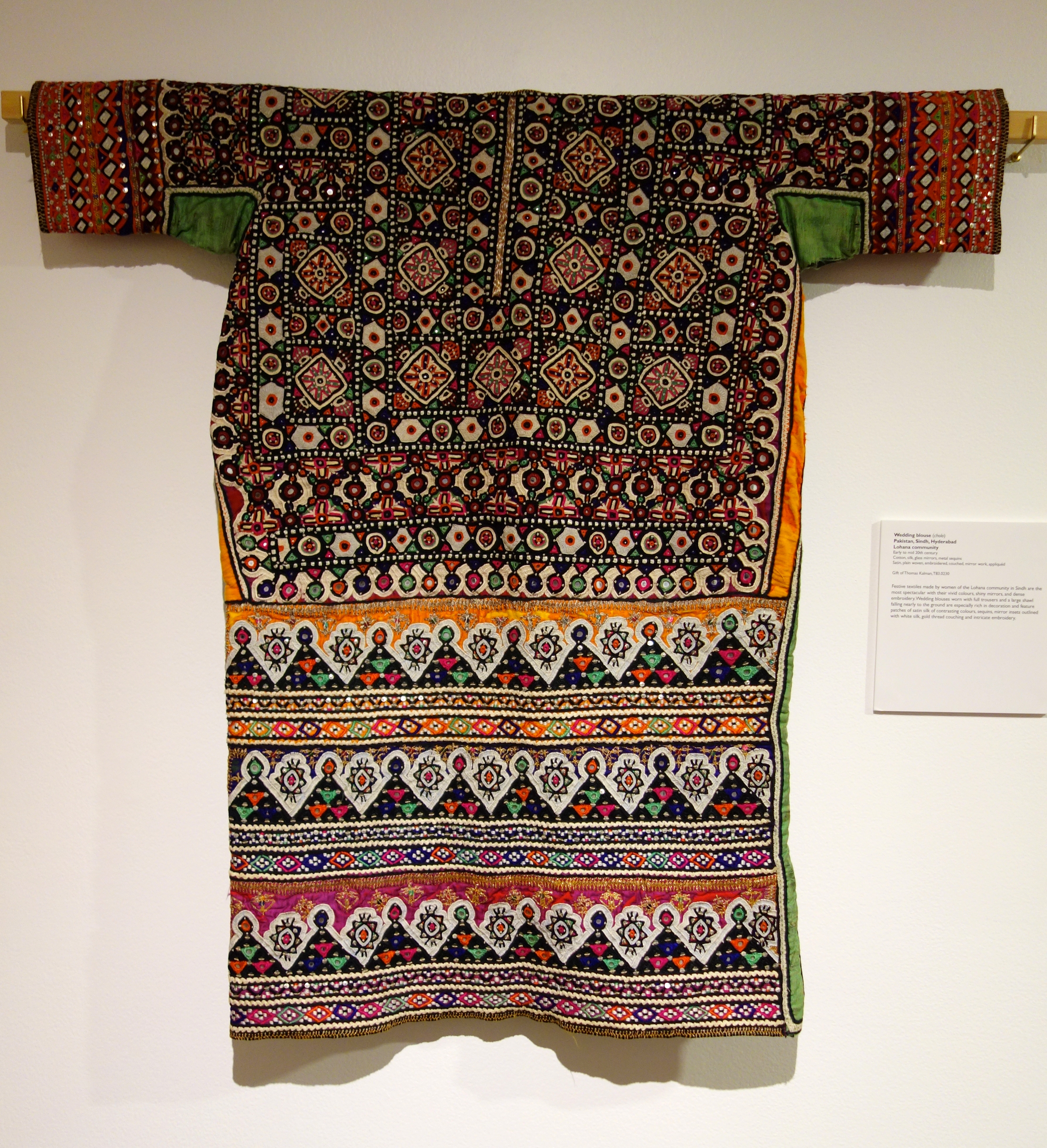
Sindhi embroidered wedding Cholo from Hyderabad.

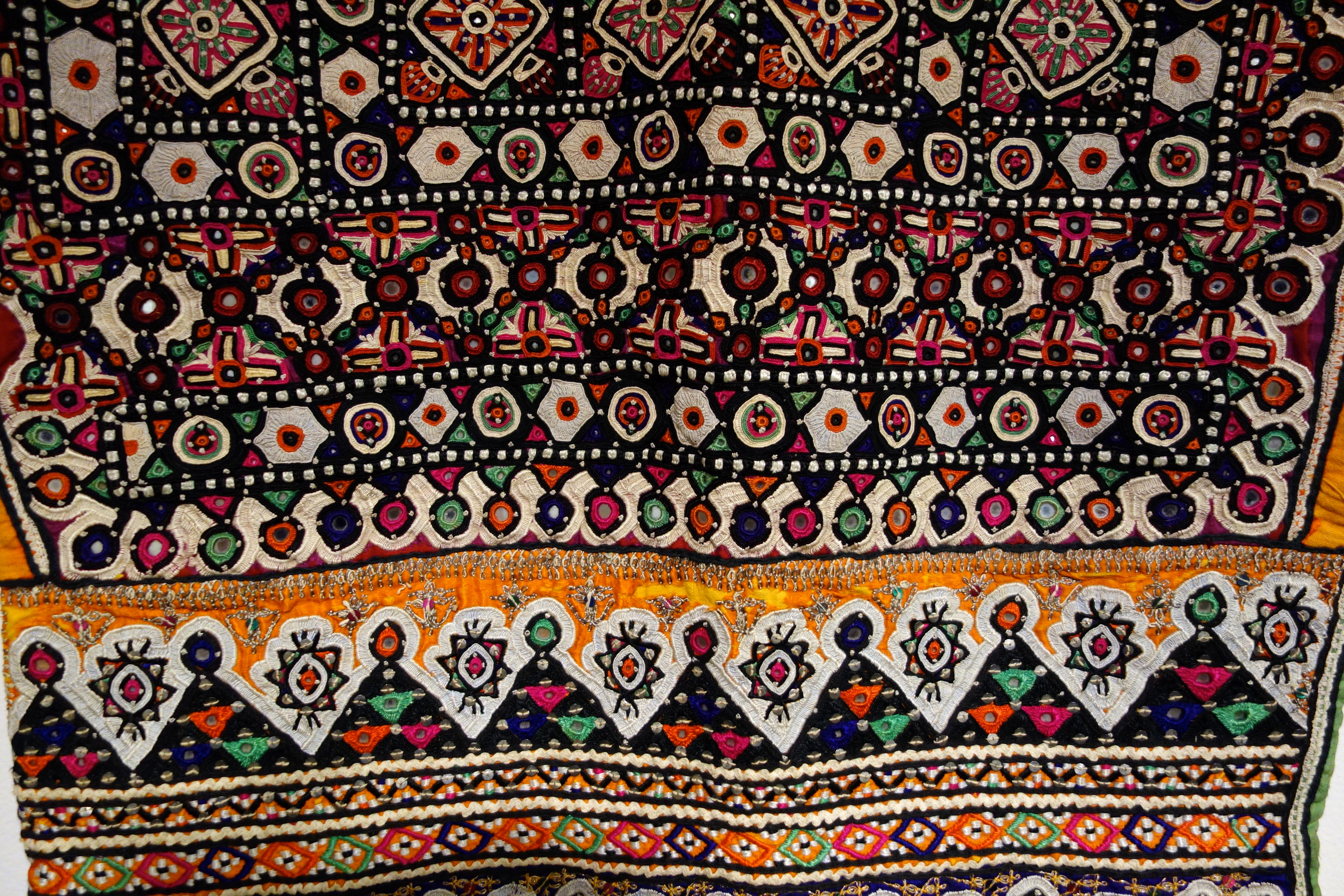
Sindhi embroidered wedding Cholo from Hyderabad.

The girls of the various farming, herding and merchant castes of Sindh have a dowry tradition in which the girl to be married will create with the help of her female relatives an embroidered trousseau consisting of costumes for herself, for the bridegroom, hangings for the home, quilts, and even trappings for the domestic animals: camels, horses and oxen. All these will be presented at the wedding ceremony to show her prowess with a needle and to prove that she is ready to take up her duties as wife, mother and homemaker. Pieces are decorated in a bewildering variety of techniques. Applying tiny mirrors attached with buttonhole and other stitch is the technique most characteristic of Sindhi work, but couching, appliqué and metal thread work are also very popular. Each caste has its own designs and motifs and favored color schemes particular array to such a degree that embroidery becomes a mark identification. A certain style of needlework becomes a badge of cultural identity. What is worn indicates caste, status and often the very village to which one belongs. It is seen as the duty of the mother to pass on the embroidery styles of a particular community to her daughter unchanged through the generations to maintain this particular identity.

Fine embroidered dowry textiles are still part of life all over Sindh though the regions in which they are worked in profusion are the deserts of Sindh, such as Thar Parkar and Nagar Parkar. Other parts of Sind such as Thano Bula Khan area have very strong embroidery traditions linked to ostentatious marriage display, a custom of certain merchant castes. Sindhi embroidery is profuse, vibrant and still very much alive.

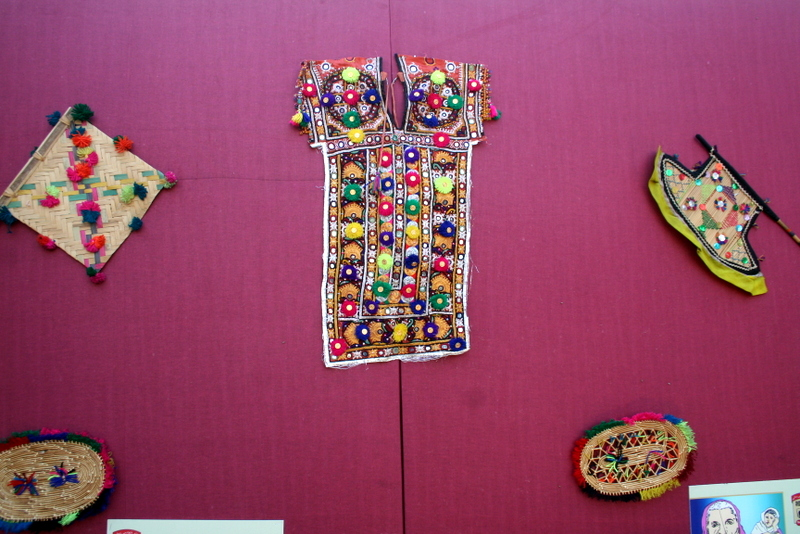
The unstitched front of gaj shirt probably from Khairpur

== History ==
Sindhi women excelled in needlework. The thin bronze needles (resembling those used for embroidery) from the excavations of Mohenjo-Daro are witness to this craft and this support the evidence of embroidery in that era. Sindhi women make fantastic patterns of rich, brilliant colours gleaming with mirrors, shells and beads. Zardosi, a special type of embroidery with a silver or golden thread, is also very famous throughout Sindh.

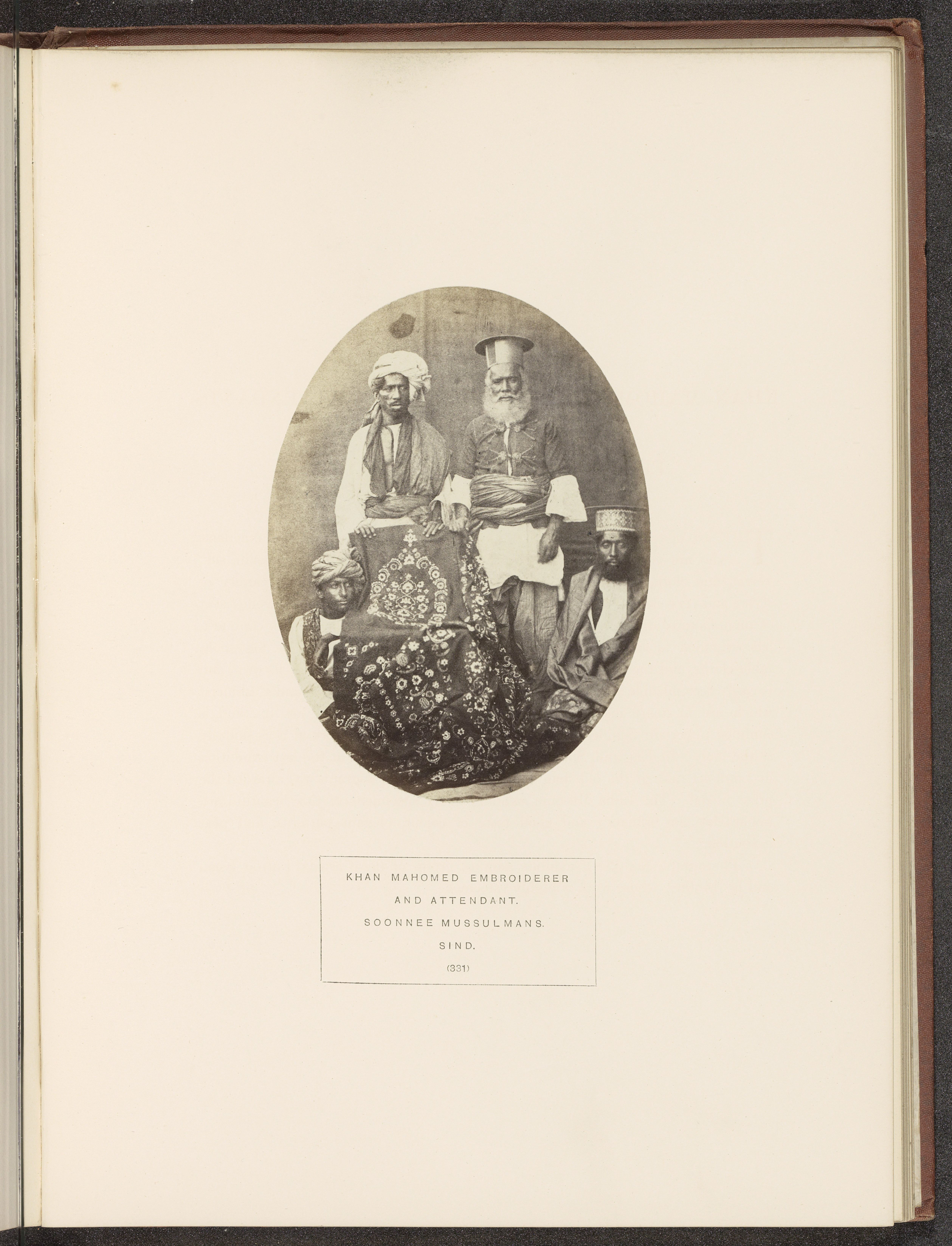
Portrait of Sindhi embroiderers

== Mirrorwork ==
Mirrorwork (Shishe jo kam/Kawan jo kam) in Sindhi. The tradition of mirrorwork embroidery is one of the major features of regional embroideries of Sindh. Sindh along with its neighbour regions are considered to be the hub of mirrorwork.

Sindh provides diverse examples of mirror work. Almost every community practices its own unique style of embroidery. Thus the styles of mirror embroidery also vary from one community to another. The style, colour, shape and even some times stitchery of mirror embroidery are also different from one region to another and from one community to another. Much of these aspects have evolved through modifications and enhancements from time to time. Foreign invasions and migrations of people from other regions have further enriched the work by intermixing of different cultures in this region.

Researchers from different parts of the world have worked on the indigenous embroideries of Sindh. Several authors described the mirror embroideries of different regions of Sindh, which includes: Ghotki, Shikarpur, Jacobabad, Khairpur, Sukkur, Mirpur Mathelo, Thano Bula Khan, Thatta, Badin, Hyderabad, Hala, Nawabshah, Mirpurkhas, Sanghar, Kashmore and multiple regions of Thaparkar particularly Umarkot, Chachro, Diplo, Nagarparkar and Mithi.

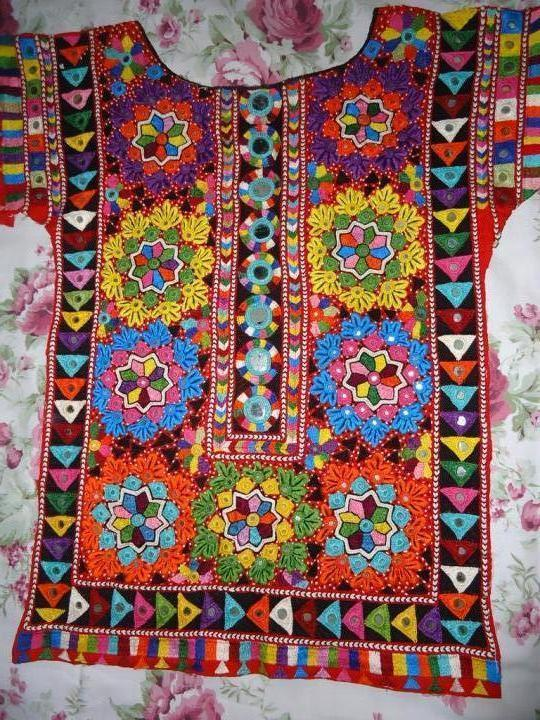
Sindhi embroidered front of a Shirt with small mirrors probably from North Sindh.

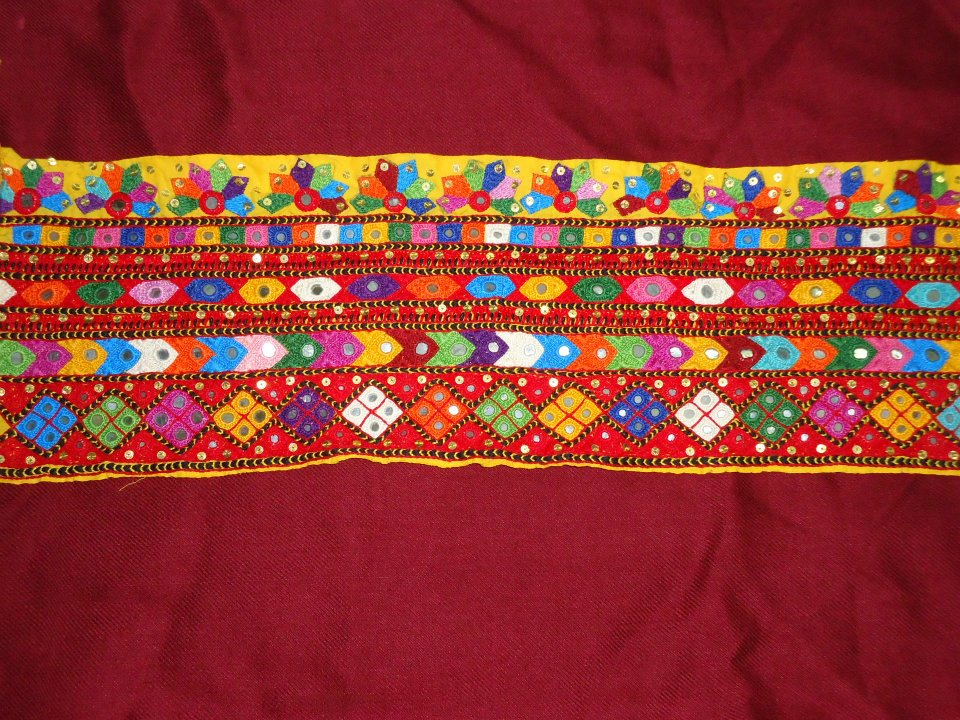
A piece of cloth embroidered with small mirrors probably from north Sindh.

In older times a mirror was assumed to frighten the evil spirits away, by terrifying them, by their own reflections. Also in ancient civilizations when sun was worshiped. The people see the gigantic sun as a sign of divine, hope or deity in itself.

Askari and Crill surveyed different regions of Sindh which produce mirror embroidery and also have catalogued the communities which produce mirror embroidery such as Mahar community near Shikarpur and Ghotki, Jat community in Badin, farming groups of Hyderabad, Hala and Nawabshah Lohana, Pallari and Burfat groups from Thano Bula Khan and a number of communities of Tharparkar region. Yacopino identified the Umarkot, Hyderabad, Sanghar and Kashmore, as some of the most important centres of mirror embroidery in Sindh.

Earlier, the mirror embroidery was mainly used for making Gaj (A solid embroidery over the woman's shirt it usually covers the area, starting from neck up to the stomach. It incorporates variety of stitches and colors. Sometimes, it is made on separate piece of cloth and then attached to the garment). Earlier, the mirror embroidery was limited to the adornment of women's attire But some of the men's products like Sindhi Topi, Agath (drawstring used in traditional pants) and Ganji are also adorned with mirror embroidery.

== Embroidery products ==
- Gaj: are traditional embroidery fronts with mirrorwork, pompoms, sequins, cowries, shells, beads and buttons over the woman's shirt it usually covers the area, starting from neck up to the stomach.
- Abochhini: embroidered wedding shawls for brides.
- Sindhi rawa/chadars: Sindhi long, wide veils are beautifully embroidered with mirrorwork on plain, printed or bandhani cloth, which are mostly worn, when women go outdoors to cover their head and body, other embroidered chadars are also offered on tombs of sufi saints.
- Akhiyo: traditional embroidered veil for brides, which is worn during days of Wanha/Wanhwa ritual times.
- Bujki: traditional Sindhi embroidered dowry purse for bride.
- Bokhano: a long embroidered narrow scarf worn on shoulders by grooms.
- Doshalo: a heavy embroidered shawl for groom on wedding day, that he wears over his shoulders.
- Gothro: is traditional embroidered sack, used for putting stuff and materials.
- Thalposh: is a coverlet, it is embroidered cover for food, fruits etc.
- Jhalposh: another type of coverlet used for the foods items.
- Ganji: traditional vests worn underneath the kamis by Sindhi men, it is usually embroidered with mirrorwork.
- Sindhi topi and top/toplo: traditional Sindhi caps, hats and hoodies are embroidered with different stitches, mirrorwork and gemstones.
- Ralli/Bedsheets: many rallis, chadars, coverlets for tables, bedsheets and pillows are embroidered with mirrorwork and sequins.
- Agath: are traditional drawstring used for tying salwar/suthan and kancha (pants), these are heavily embellished hand knitted.
- Animal ornamentations: different products like Ghani, Andheri are embroidered for animals like cows, camels, horses etc.
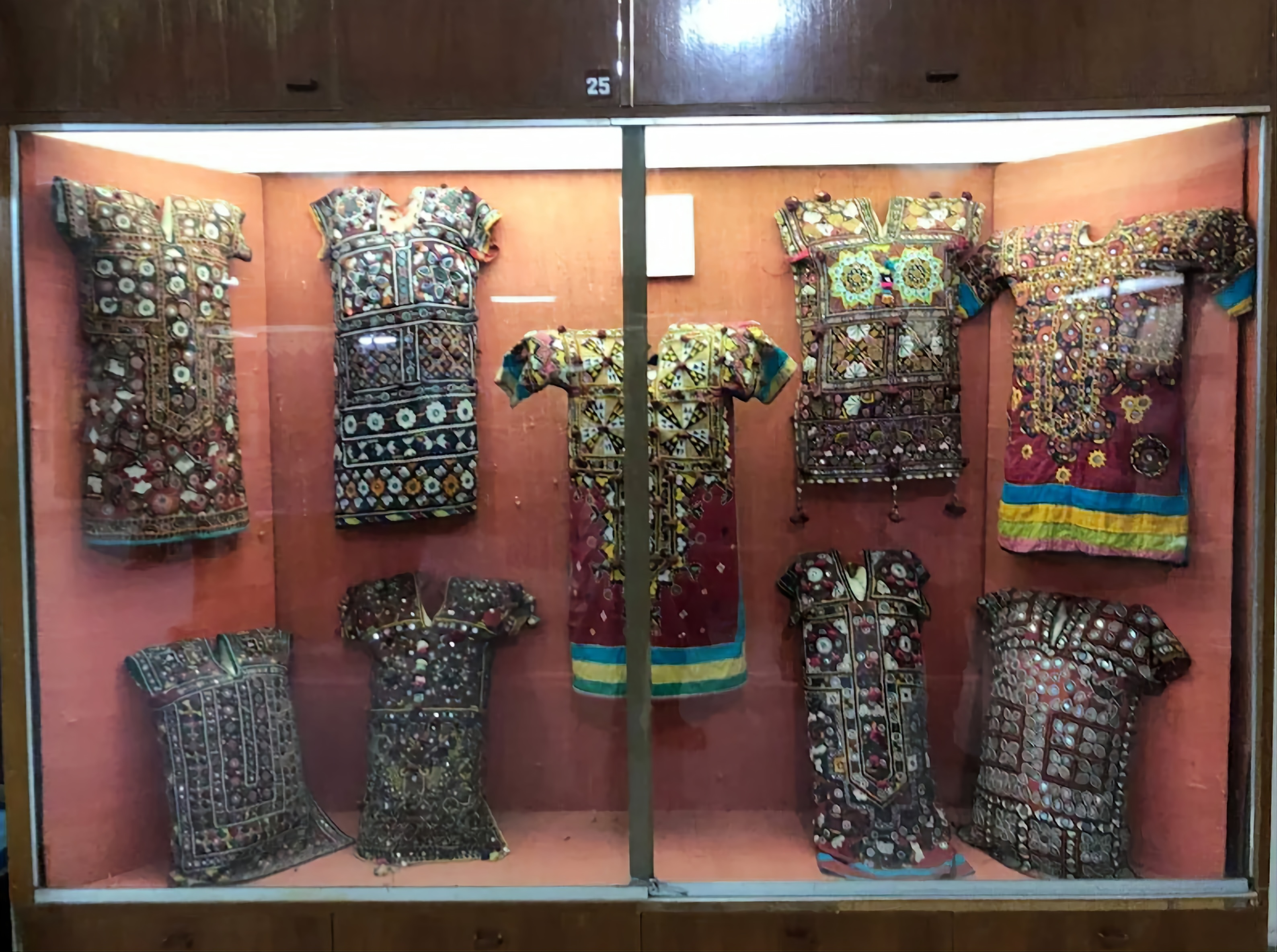
  Traditional Sindhi embroidered Gaj tunics from thar desert Sindh.

== Types of Sindhi Embroideries ==
There are so many Sindhi Stitches, some of them are mentioned below:

- Hurmuch/Hurmucho
- Pakko
- Kacho
- Mukko
- Marori
- Kundhi
- Aar
- Kharak
- Soof
- Pani work
- Gulkari
- Band
- Reso
- Bakhiyo
- Gano
- Maahi
- Kashmiro
- Aaoka
- Bijja
- Seera
- Kunh
- Kambiri
- Zanjeeri tako
- Viz

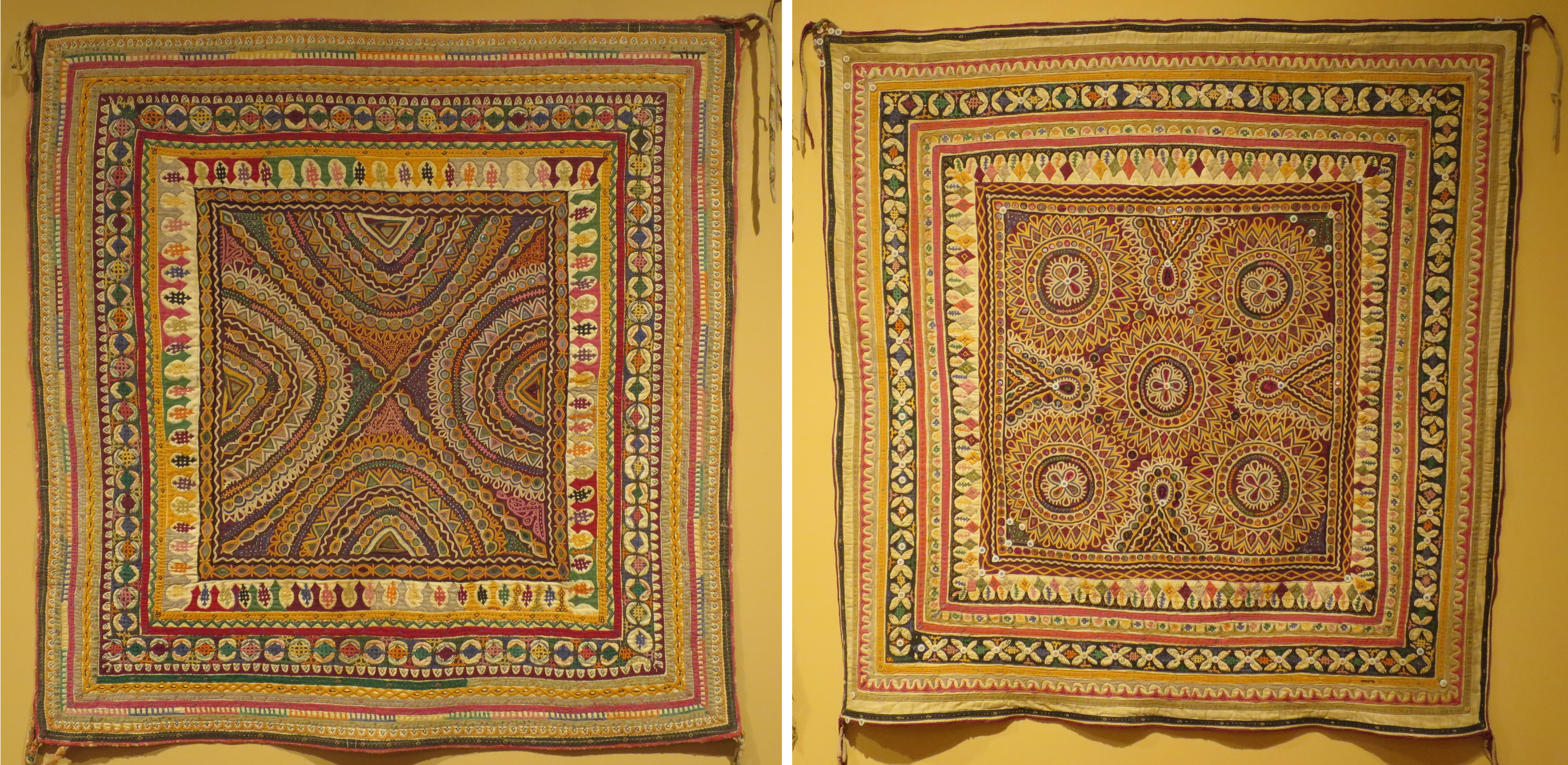
Sindhi embroidered (Band, Hurmuch, Tuk etc) baby carrier from Sindh or Kutch.

== See also ==
- The crafts of Sindh
