= Garland Cannon =

American linguist (1924–2020)

Garland Hampton Cannon
- Born: 1924
- Died: 2020 (aged 95–96)
- Education: University of Texas, Austin (PhD)
- Scientific career
- Fields: linguistics

Garland Hampton Cannon (1924–2020) was an American linguist and Professor of English and Linguistics at Texas A&M University.

== Books ==
- The Persian Contributions to the English Language: A Historical Dictionary, Garland Cannon and Alan S. Kaye, Wiesbaden: Harrassowitz Verlag, 2001
- The Life and Mind of Oriental Jones: Sir William Jones, The Father of Modern Linguistics. Cambridge: Cambridge University Press. 1990
