= Alan S. Kaye =

American linguist

- Born: March 2, 1944; Los Angeles, California
- Died: May 31, 2007 (aged 63)
- Education: UCLA (BA, 1965) University of California, Berkeley (MA, 1968) (PhD, 1971)
- Scientific career
- Fields: Linguistics
- Institutions: California State University, Fullerton

Alan Stewart Kaye (March 2, 1944 - May 31, 2007) was an American linguist and professor at California State University, Fullerton. He is best known for his works on Semitic and other language families. He died of cancer on May 31, 2007.

== Books ==
- Semitic Studies in Honor of Wolf Leslau, A. Kaye, ed.(1991)
- The Persian Contributions to the English Language: A Historical Dictionary, Garland Cannon and Kaye S. Alan, Wiesbaden: Harrassowitz Verlag, 2001
- Afroasiatic Linguistics, Semitics, and Egyptology: Selected Writings of Carleton T. Hodge, Co-edited with Scott Noegel. Bethesda, MD: CDL Press, 2004
- Chadian and Sudanese Arabic in the Light of Comparative Arabic Dialectology, De Gruyter Mouton 1976
- Pidgin and creole languages : a basic introduction, with Alan S.l Tosco, 2001
- A Dictionary of Nigerian Arabic. California: Undena Publications. 1982.
- Morphologies of Asia and Africa (ed.), Penn State University Press 2007
