= Sindhi traditions and rituals =

Traditions of the Sindhi people

Sindhi traditions and rituals (Sindhi: سنڌي رسم ۽ رواج) refers to some Sindhi practices that span a person's life. They differ across regions.

== Muslim pregnancy and birth traditions ==
=== Pregnancy ===
During the seventh month of a woman's pregnancy, a celebration called khunba is held. Close female relatives, friends and neighbors are invited and traditional folk songs (e.g., sehra, lada, and geech) are sung. Guests put rice, fruits, and dry fruits into the pregnant mother's lap and give money (ghor) to her. After the celebration, she goes to her maternal home, where she lives with her parents for the remainder of her pregnancy and gives birth to the child.

=== Birth ===
When a child is born, the Bangha (adhan) is recited in their right ear and Kalmas in the left ear by an older man or the baby's father. Families hold celebrations where they serve sweets. The child's umbilical cord is buried on the side of the house's door. The dai is given money and clothes. On the birth of a male child, the game of colors (Rangan ji Rand) is also played.

On the night after the birth, the mother's female relatives gather to present milk, handmade clothes, gold rings, food, small rallis called rilka, and other items as gifts to the mother and her newborn. Black threads called dhagha or sagra are tied on the baby's wrists and ankles, gold rings are put on both hands, a ta'wiz is tied around their neck, surmo (kohl) is applied on the eyes, and marks or dots are made on the face for protection from the evil eye, while women sing traditional folk songs. The gifts given by relatives and neighbors are then shown to everyone.

A mullan (priest) is summoned, and, after some ceremonies and presents, a name for the child is taken either from religious works or decided upon according to the rules of judicial astrology. The Sindhis in the hills usually call their children by the names of plants and fruits; for example, Gul (flower), Kando (thorn), and Ambu (mango). These calls are repeated for six days, which is the usual time for refreshment offered to the guests. The child's body and face is massaged daily with oil called aadh before a bath. When the child sleeps, their body, arms, and legs are tightly tied in a cloth called tanjan or bandan. The baby sleeps on rilkas with small pillows, and a clay or wooden object with two poles called munh rakhi or rakhni with a cloth placed over it is placed above the child's head.

=== Chhattri ===
Chhattri is celebrated on the sixth day after the child's birth. Relatives, friends and neighbors are invited, and a feast is prepared for guests. The celebration involves the playing of musical instruments such as the dhul, sharnai, and bagpipes.

The ceremony of akiko, or jandre, involves shaving the hair of male children when the boy is between three months and one year old. The immediate family, close relatives, and neighbors visit a nearby dargah, while women sing traditional folk songs. The principal part of the festivity is the sacrifice of a sheep without blemish, which must be slain according to the usual rules. The practitioners remove the flesh from the bones, carefully observing that none of the latter are broken, and with the former prepare a feast for the olema, relations and mendicants. When the child's hair has been shaved by a barber, the hair is weighed against silver or gold, which is later given in charity. The hair placed with the sheep's bones in the animal's skin is buried either in a mukam (burial ground) or at the threshold of the door. The popular idea is that on the day of resurrection the contents of the skin will arise in the shape of a horse, and triumphantly carry the child over As-Sirāt into Paradise.

Child's walk ceremony

When a child starts walking a small celebration is done called pair mani, and the child is made to stand on an earthen plate and a thread is tied on their feet.

The ceremony of sathri or toharu (circumcision) is generally performed when the boy is eight years old. A feast of rice, meat, and other delicacies is prepared for the guests, and the festivities are accompanied by musicians and fireworks. The boy is dressed in saffron or white clothes and adorned with a morh (a kind of headdress on face), and garlands made of money. Henna is applied on the boy's hands and feet, and traditional folk songs are sung. The boy is then taken outside for sargas: the boy is mounted on horseback or in a car and led around the town to the sound of dhol, sharnai, instruments, singing, and gunfire. When he returns home, the boy is tied with a red lungi (sarong) and the barber performs the operation. Immediately after the operation, clothes and money are waved round the boy's head and given to the operator and the minstrels who are present, and food is distributed to beggars.

In the north of Sindh, there is a custom of preventing any mishap during the operation by making the anxious mother stand with a millstone on her head while a male relative pours water on it. In the south, the father is made to stand instead of the mother, with his feet in water and a Koran on his head. After the recovery of the patient on the 11th day, it is necessary for father to feast close relations and friends, but each guest is expected to bring a small money present (pahat).

== Muslim wedding traditions ==
Sindhi marriages are mostly arranged and done among relatives or in the same castes, but today love marriages are also common.

=== Pre-wedding rituals ===
The boy's family first visits the girl's home in a meeting called padhri or gaalh paki, where they ask her parents' permission for their son to marry their daughter. If the girl's parents accept the proposal, then sweets and milk are served, and everyone prays for the new couple.

The manghni/manghno/pothi is a betrothal ceremony performed at the latest a month before the wedding, on the lucky day being any Monday, Wednesday, Thursday or Friday in the months of Ramazan, Rabi el Akhar, Rajab, and Shaaban.

On the day of manghno, the groom's family arrives at the bride's house with a long embroidered veil (pothi), a bodice (cholo), and pantaloons (suthan); sometimes a lehengha is also given, as well as some ornaments such as a haar necklace, and different kinds of gold rings. The bride's house is decorated before the guests' arrival, and the house usually divided into the two parties: the males sit together while the females are accompanied by a hajaman (barber's wife). The future bride is then dressed in the clothes and ornaments and seated in a conspicuous part of the room. The bridegroom's mother first puts a big embroidered veil pothi on the bride before putting the engagement ring on her finger. Then, each of the seven suhaganio married women applies oil on her hair and braids it while applying henna on her hands and feeding her sweets. Other women sing traditional folk songs, the bride's mother sends the hajaman to the men's assembly with a large pot of milk for the groom's father. She compels them to drink with many compliments and congratulations, then sweets, dried dates and patasa are served for both men and women; those who are wealthy would serve zardo and sindhi pulao/biryani with other items. Men then dance with joy on the sound of dhol and sharnai. Afterwards, the men raise their hands and recite the Fatihah; after this the girl's father is asked to appoint some time for the marriage. He does so naming the month and day, upon which all parties rise up and leave the house. At this point it is considered improper to break off the match.

Between the betrothal and the wedding, the bridegroom's parents and relatives send the bride gifts on celebratory occasions such as Eid al-Fitr. Gifts might include money, sweetmeats, and clothing.

About a month before the wedding, wanah or wanhwa wiharanu is performed, which happens for five or seven days today. The family of the groom comes to the bride's house with some sweetmeats, clarified butter, fruits, dry fruits, perfumed oil, henna, and an akhiyo, a small piece of embroidered cloth used as a veil. The bride sits in a corner of a room with the akhiyo on her face until the wedding day. Some rituals like applying oil in hair by married women is also done called wanah ja sath with ladies singing traditional folk songs. Once these rituals are done and everyone leaves, the bride stays in one room, and no one is permitted to see her face. A female relative must be sitting with her throughout this time, as it is believed that evil spirits can harm the bride or bridegroom if they are left alone.

During this time, the bride has no obligations besides the religious obligations to pray five times a day; many brides will also recite the Quran and pray for herself and for her married life. She eats a special bread called busri and churo or khorak, made up with the dry fruits, sweetmeats and the clarified butter sent by the groom. Until the wedding, the bride is only allowed to eat healthy food, made with fruits and homemade butter and oil. This is said to increase delicacy of skin and complexion. During wanah the bride's nose is pierced, as traditionally girls only pierced their nose when they plan to marry; it was considered bad for unmarried girls to pierce their nose.

The barber's wife attends every day to bathe and wash the bride with pithi (a replacement for soap, composed of sweet oil and flour of wheat or mash, the mung bean), and body hair is removed. At times sandalwood and rose water were rubbed upon the head and body, after the former has been thoroughly combed and washed with the clay (known as metu) and lime juice. The young beginner is instructed in the science of handling a bit of musk enclosed in embroidered cloth, and Tira, or moles, are drawn upon her face and lips with needles dipped in antimony and other coloring materials. These preparations continue for many days, and during the whole period, visitors flock to the house and are accommodated by the bride's father. The ladies all sing traditional folk songs called sanjhri every evening from wanahu until the wihan (marriage). Many of these things are not done anymore due to modernization; the bride simply goes to a parlour or beauty salon for her cosmetics and grooming.

The bridegroom is given a dagger and a tasbeh in his hands and a gano (bracelet) to wear on his wrist. The groom carries the dagger and tasbeh all the time until wedding night, and an arhar is appointed to be with him all the time till wedding. He is also fed healthy homemade busri, churo or khorak, food made with cooking oil and butter, fruit, dry fruits, and milk. Three days are considered sufficient to clean him with pithi and dress him in rich clothes mostly white in color, a shawl ajrak/lungi, patko, and garlands of money and flowers. He is also supposed to perform nimaz five times a day and recite the Quran and pray for himself and for his married life. The groom is shown to the public at Maulud commemorations of the Prophet's nativity, feasts given to the relations and friends of the family. Dance is also performed.

Bukki is done after wanahu, in which thread is tied to a big earthen pot called ukhri, and the dried dates are crushed into it while ladies sing traditional folk songs. The bridegroom's uncle ties a mohr on the groom's face. He lies down on a khat, and his sisters, mother and other relatives apply henna on his hands and feet. The groom's family then goes to the bride's house and performs rituals called bukki ja sath. They give the bride her wedding dress, jewelry, ornaments, and cosmetics.

Parr diyanu is a ritual in which the bridegroom's family goes to a village's dargah and offers a chadar sheet of cloth with Quranic verses written on it; this sheet is called parr. They also offer fresh rose petals on the grave of the saint, as well as a distribution of sweets, dried dates, biscuits, or anything else they can afford to be distributed among the people present at the dargah.

=== Wedding rituals ===
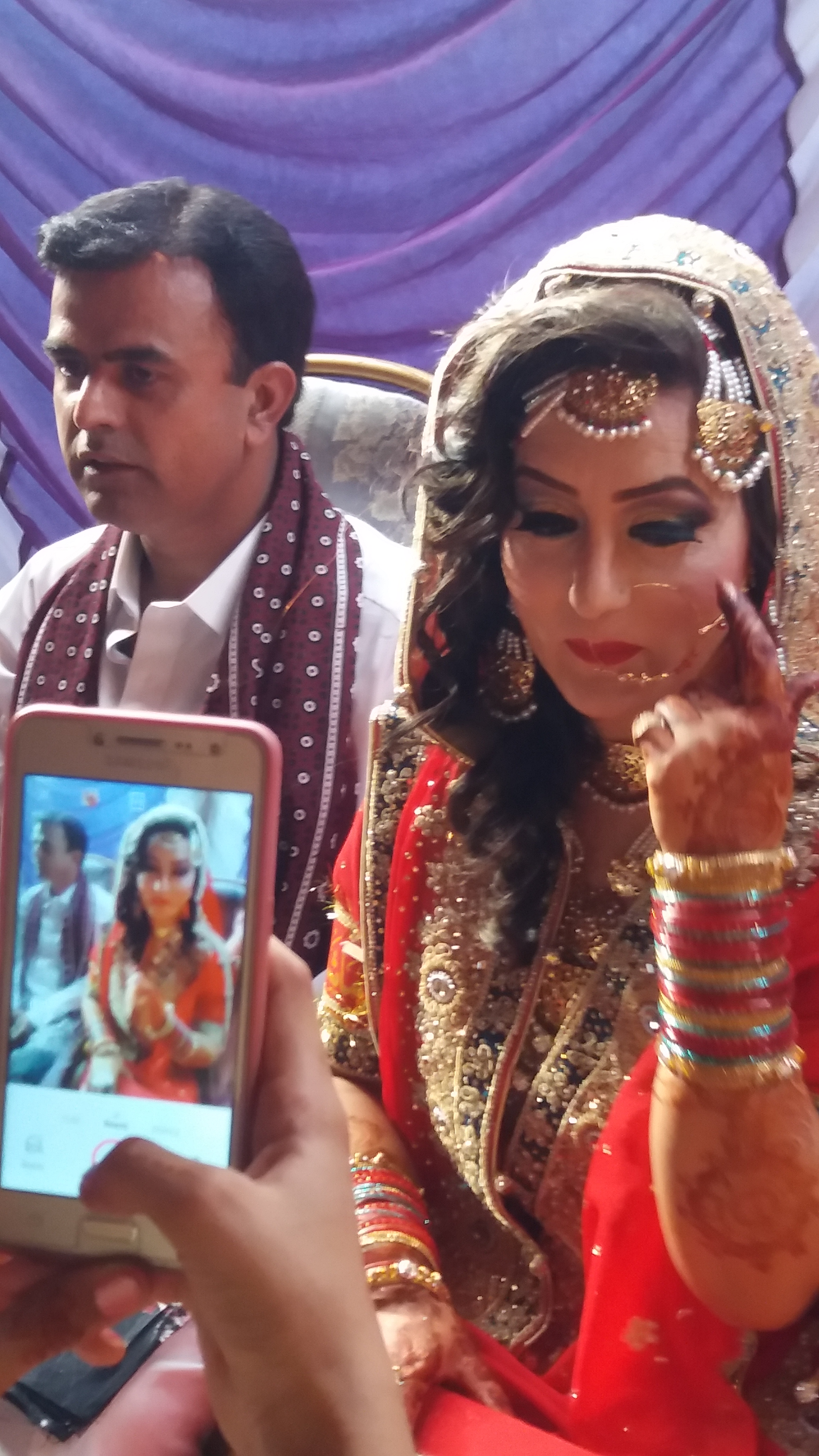
Sindhi bride and groom.

The wihan or shadi (marriage ceremony) is usually performed at night. Early in the evening the barber appears at the groom's house, gets him ready, dresses him in new white salwar khamis (shirt and trousers), a turban, waistband, shawl, another red or pink embroidered veil on his head, a mohr, and a pair of shoes everything sent by the bride's relations. At the same time, the bride is dressed by the barber's wife in a suit of clothes, together with various kinds of jewels procured for her by her future spouse's family. After the cosmetics, the expiatory ceremony called ghor is performed by waving or throwing money over the heads of both parties. The cast-off clothes are the perquisites of the hajam (barber) and his wife. Later the bride is made ready for the wedding ceremony: the wedding dress is usually red colored cholo (tunic), suthan (trousers), lengho (skirt) and one or two veils with a lot of jewelry and ornaments—the most important being the nath (nose jewel), as it symbolizes the marital status in Sindhi Muslim society. She wears the nath for few days even after her marriage. It is replaced by the bullo; another important piece of jewelry is the chura, but it has less importance nowadays. As great attention is paid to the dressing; it is rarely finished before midnight.

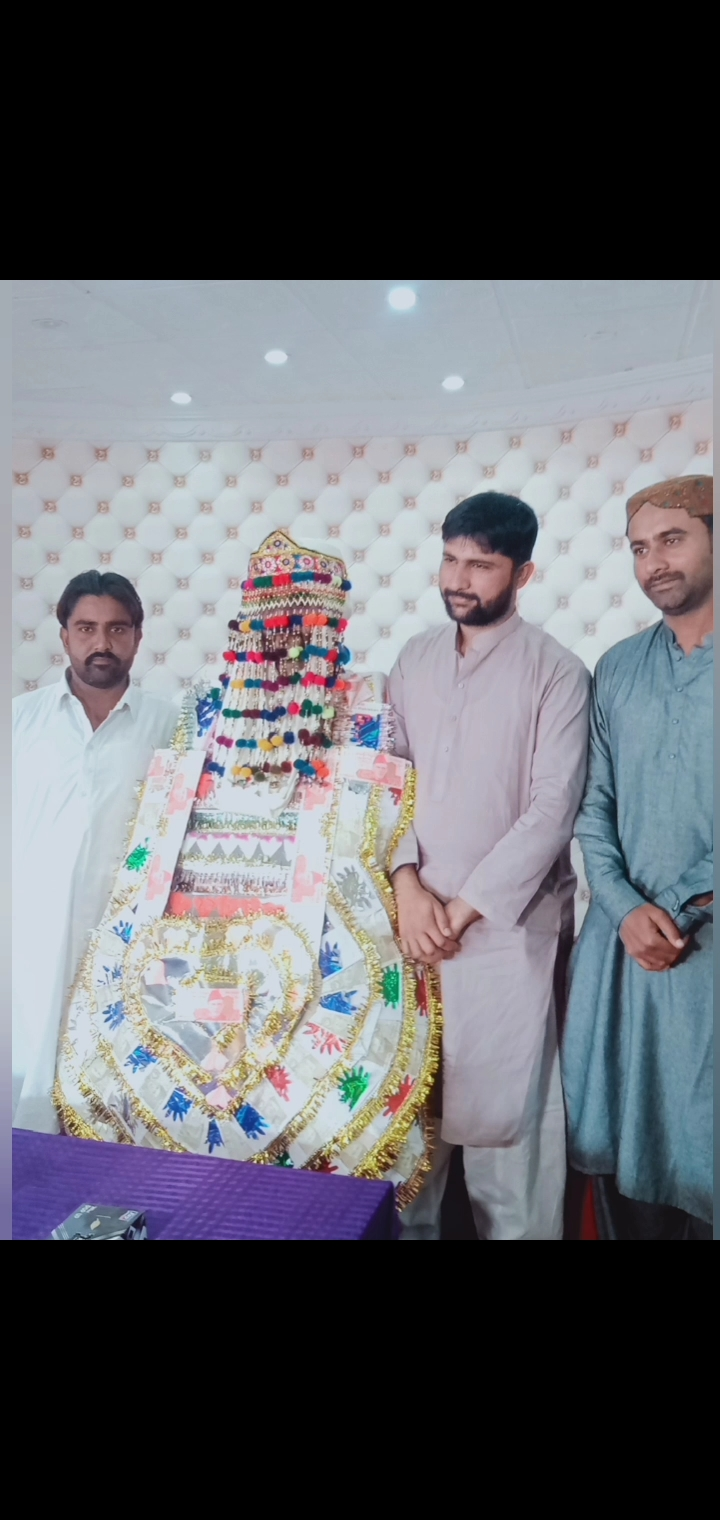
Sindhi groom with "Morh" and garland made of money.

A wedding procession called jjanjja takes place from the groom's house to the bride's house. Traditionally, the groom rode on a horse or on a camel surrounded by his relatives and friends; nowadays a decorated car may also be used. The procession members dance, sing, and play music. Once they reach the bride's house, fireworks are set off, and dance and music are performed.

Nikah is a tradition where the groom reaches the bride's house, and all the men are welcomed in a shamiano, a large ceremonial tent made specially for weddings and other events where the wedding feast is also served, and the women into their own section, where they are greeted and sing traditional folk songs there. The priest, seated between the bridegroom and the bride's father, performs nikah rites, the witnesses or "wakils" are sent to bride's room for her approval mostly her father and brothers, the "Haq-Mahr" (settlements) given by bridegroom is made according to Islamic laws, once the nikah is performed everyone raises their hands and pray, the priest recites verses from the Quran, then the nikah is completed. The bridegroom and his father are congratulated and given ghor and money garlands on them. Both bride and groom are officially married according to Islamic laws.

After nikah, the groom enters the bride's house with his mother, sisters, and other female relatives and are welcomed in by the sisters, friends, and female cousins of the bride, who take the opportunity to perform a number of ceremonies at the home's entrance, including:

- Dhakkun bhanjan: A small earthen dhakkanu (pot-cover) is placed upside down on ground in front of bridegroom, who tries to break it in one stomp.
- Kandi/taro kapanu: In some regions of Sindh, a kandi (thorn branch) is planted firmly in the ground, and the groom is given a sword to cut through it with a single strike.
- Daawan diyan: The bride's sister ties a long thread between the groom's little finger to a foot. The groom is supposed to break or tear the thread by pulling it in opposite directions.
- Pani ji rasm and surmo application: Drops of water are sprinkled on the groom, or kohl is applied to the groom's eyes.

The bride's sisters ask for money in return for these ceremonies.

The Walima (Arabic: وليمة), meaning “feast” or “banquet,” is the reception hosted by the groom’s side following the Nikah ceremony. It is considered a Sunnah in Islam, signifying public acknowledgment of the marriage, celebration, and gratitude.

Once the rituals at the door are done, the groom is let into the house and seated on a khat with his face towards the west. The bride's sisters and cousins get the bride and have her sit opposite the groom. A large bolster is placed between the couple. The rituals are performed there.

- Laau/lawan diyan: The groom's uncles and their wives come one by one and compel the bride and groom's to touch foreheads seven times in succession. Each participants gives the couple money while other women sing traditional folk songs.
- Phula/gula chundanu: When the laau is over, the sohagan throws at the bride about a dozen cotton flowers dyed with saffron or turmeric; the groom collects them and sets them aside.
- Tira maanu: A quantity of white and dry tira (Sesamum) is brought in on a large metal platter and placed before the bride. The sohagan joins the bride's palms together, fills them with the grain, and pours it six or seven times into the groom's hands while singing sehra dedicated to this ritual.
- Chanwara maanu: After tira maanu, the sohagan places before the bridegroom a platter filled with salt and white rice in equal proportions. The groom pours six or seven palmfuls of the grain into his bride's hands.
- During kheer mundri, a bowl of milk is placed between the bride and bridegroom. A ring is dropped in the bowl of milk, and bride and groom race to find it; whoever finds it first wins. This is repeated three times.
- Winjri ji sath: a local handfan is given to the groom, and covered in the groom's shawl and made him put the end stick of handfan touch on the bride's head and shoulders; the bride then repeats the same ritual on the groom.
- Muth kholanu: A dry date is placed in the bride's right hand; she is told to hold it firmly and the bridegroom tries to take it from her using only one hand.
- Tik rasam: Also called munh dekharanu, A big mirror is placed in between the couple and then the veil of bride is slightly opened and groom's mohr are also put aside, both bride and bridegroom see each other in the mirror. The groom gives a gift for seeing the face of bride.
- Gandh kholaru: the corners of the bride's veil and groom's shawl are tied in a knot, which the groom is supposed to untie with only his thumb and little finger.
- Kheer piyarni: the bride and then the groom drink a bowl or glass of milk.
- Pallav badhanu: the corners of the bride and groom's veils are tied tightly together, and the newly-wedded couple leaves the bride's house.
- Jutto likai: Earlier in the day, the bride's sisters hid the shoes of the bridegroom, and as he leaves they will ask him for money in exchange for his shoes.
- Rukhsati: After all the wedding rituals are performed, the bride sees off her mother, father, brother, sisters and other relatives.
- Chawar ji rasam: the last ritual in some part of Sindh, where the bride leaves her house, takes rice in her hands, and throws it behind her.

As the bride leaves the house, the Quran is carried above her head as they walk to the bridegroom's house.

=== Post wedding rituals ===
Directly after the wedding, a reception called walimo takes place.

Satawro takes place on the seventh day after the wedding. The newly-wedded bride and her husband visits her parents' house, where they are served a meal.

== Muslim death and funerary traditions ==
All the death rituals are done according to Islamic teachings.

When a person is seen to be in sakarat (the agonies of death), everyone present recites the Shahada, and the holy water from the Zamzam Well, if available, is squeezed into person's mouth.

Ghusl-e-mayat is given to the dead person by the ghassal (corpse bather). Once ghusl-e-mayat is done, the ghassal places the body on a sheet which is spread over a khatolo. Next they put on the kafan (shroud), a large piece of cotton torn so as to pass over the head. Appropriate usage dictates that it should not be sewn in any part, that it should reach down to the calves of the legs, and that religious sentences should be traced with clay from Mecca upon the portion that covers the dead man's chest. Various perfumes such as rosewater, attar of roses, and the powder called abir are sprinkled over the body. It is then covered with a sheet, the skirts of which are tied together at both ends with that upon which the corpse is lying. Finally, a shawl, or some such covering, is thrown over the sheet, a Koran, belonging to the priest, is placed at the head of the bier, and the corpse is ready for interment.

On the third day after the funeral, the principal waris (heir) slaughter a cow or a goat, according to their circumstances, and gives the first funeral feast, the treyo, to the family, relatives, and neighbors and all that were present at the interment. This is the proper time for settling legacies and discharging the outstanding debts of the deceased. After the feast, the akhund and his coadjutors recite the whole Quran, with each repeating a single section. They receive in payment small presents of money, scented oils, betel nuts and other such articles. The ghassal is rewarded with gifts, with one of his perquisites being the clothes of the deceased. Prayers are then offered, and the company separates. Mourning continues until the seventh or eleventh day.

Another feast given by the waris is the daho on the tenth day after the death. The ceremonies differ little from what take place on the treyo.

The ceremonies are the same on the chaliho, the feast on the fortieth day. Up to this time, friends and relatives visit the deceased's family, generally twice a day, morning and evening, and the women of the house are all clad in sua (dirty clothes). At the end of the feast, the guests give sets of bangles or new clothes and one chādar (veil) to close female relatives of the deceased as a symbolic gesture to break the sua.

The last feast given is on the baraho (12th month), the anniversary of the death. It usually concludes the funeral rites, though some families are so affectionate as to keep up the practice of sending food to the akhund, twice a day, on all great festivals.

The higher orders usually pay several akhunds to read the Quran over a relative's grave for forty days in succession; even the poorest do their best to secure the luxury for a week or fortnight. Among the more literary classes, it is not unusual for an individual occasionally to peruse the sacred volume in the presence of the dead many years after their decease. The idea is that the religious merit of the act will belong to the person in whose favour it is done on the great day of reward and punishment.

When the grave is filled in, earth is heaped upon the top in different shapes. Sometimes, it is raised in cylindrical form about one span high, sprinkled with water, and smeared with kahgil; others merely make a heap of mould covered with pebbles, or spread leaves of the arak tree. Over the remains of respectable men they erect brick and lime tombstones. The grave is repaired if it gets damaged.

When the father of a family dies, his eldest son is given all familial responsibilities after his father. The eldest son becomes the guardian of the family, and a small ceremony is called on, in which close relatives gather and tie the pagg on the head of the eldest son who is referred to as the paggdar. It is symbolic, as even if the eldest son is very young, he receives the turban.

== Hindu wedding traditions ==
=== Pre-wedding rituals ===
Pakki mishri is where the groom's family visits the bride's house with lavish gifts and sweets called shagun.

Berana satsang is performed for all the wedding functions to go smoothly. Women sing Sindhi ladas (traditional folk songs), and the devotional Jhulelal songs are played.

The ceremony of Ganesh Stapana is where the bride and groom are not allowed to leave the house until the wedding ceremony.

Tih is a ritual where the bride's family visits the groom's place with a priest. The priest carries several items called shubh samagri in a bag of rice, sugar, spices, coconut, sweets, dates, a green colored ball of silk yarn, and a piece of paper on which an auspicious time is written. After reaching the groom's house, the priest conducts a Ganesh pooja with the samagris he brought and places the piece of paper in the groom's lap.

The sagri or mehndi is the formal introduction between the bride's and groom's families.

For Mehendi, the family gathers around the bride, where henna is applied on her hands, arms and feet.

Jenya is a thread ceremony called upanayana, a sacred ritual at the groom's house. A sacred prayer is performed along a traditional yajna ritual.

=== Wedding day ===
For swagat, the bride performs a traditional aarti (prayer) and tilak, and she pulls the groom's nose playfully. Sugar and cardamom is offered to the groom. Then the groom enters in wedding venue and sits in a mandapa with the bride at his side.

Hathialo is a Sindhi Hindu wedding ritual in which the right hands of the bride and groom are tied together. A red cloth is used to cover the tied hands, and the bride and groom both pray to the gods.

In kanyadaan, the father's bride pours holy water over the joined hands of the couple, and he requests the groom to love, respect, and care for his bride for the rest of their lives.

After the saptapadi ritual, the wedding is completed and the newly-wedded couple seek the blessings of elders by touching their feet. Then the couple leaves the wedding venue, and the bride leaves her parental house. The bride receives gifts from her father before she departs for her new home.

=== Post-wedding rituals ===
When the bride reaches her in-laws' house along her husband, her feet are washed with water and milk by the groom's family.

A priest determines the auspicious day of satawara, which is when the married couple visits the wife's parents' house for lunch or dinner after their wedding.

The reception, called gadjani, is hosted by the groom's family. Food is served alongside singing, dancing and drinking.

== Leisure ==
=== Mallah wrestling ===
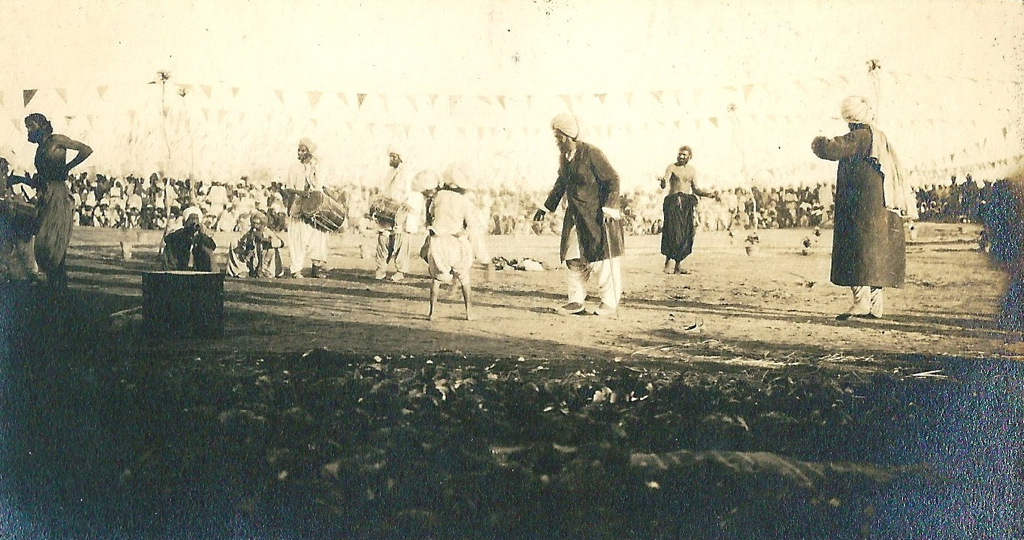
Mallah wrestling in Hyderabad.

The wrestlers have a diet of flesh, clarified butter and milk, and are compelled to abstain from flatulent food, drinking, and smoking. An ustad (trainer) teaches the different moves. The dress worn during the contest is the patko that is worn round the head, a pair of drawers, and a waistband.

=== Malakhra ===
Malakhra is an ancient Sindhi form of wrestling in Sindh, which dates back 5,000 years. The match begins with both wrestlers tying a twisted cloth around the opponent's waist. Each one then holds onto the opponent's waist cloth and tries to throw him to the ground. Malakhra is one of the favorite sports among males in Sindh. Malakhra matches are generally held on holidays and Fridays and in every local fairs and festivals. Rich feudal lords and influential persons maintain famous malhoo (wrestlers) and organise matches for them.

=== Cockfighting ===
Cockfighting is a popular entertainment of local of Sindh.

=== Horse, camel, and bull races ===
The horse, camel, and bull races are popular games in Sindh. They mostly take place on fairs of local dargahs of pirs (tombs of saints).

== Games ==
=== Tritran ===
The tritran (Three Corners) of the Sindhis is also known as katar by the Persians and Afghans. The latter people are very fond of it, especially the lower orders in the country villages, where the greybeards assemble and play together for hours over a few lines marked with a stick on the ground. Even in Sindh, it is rare to find such an article of refinement as a board or a cloth made for Tritran. The game is very simple: each player has three pieces (generally pebbles or cowries), which are put down in turn, and he wins that first can place all three in a straight line. Nautran (nine-corners), and sorahtran (sixteen-corners) are games resembling tritran in all points, except that there are more lines and counters.

=== Chaupar ===
Chaupar is a cross and circle board game played in Sindh that is very similar to pachisi. It was the favorite game of kings and princes of Sindh, and it was given to daughters in dowry. The board is made of wool or cloth, with wooden pawns and seven cowry shells used to determine each player's move, chaupur is distinguished from pachisi because of the use of three four-sided long dice.

=== Shatranj ===
Shatranj is an indoor chess game that is believed to have been invented in Sindh. There were many famous players of this game.
