= The Persian Contributions to the English Language: An Historical Dictionary =

- Author: Garland Cannon, Alan S. Kaye
- Language: English
- Subject: Persian loanwords in English
- Publisher: Harrassowitz Verlag
- Publication date: 2001
- Media type: Print (hardcover)
- Pages: 190
- ISBN: 3447045035

The Persian Contributions to the English Language: An Historical Dictionary is a 2001 book by Garland Cannon and Alan S. Kaye. It is a historical dictionary of Persian loanwords in English which includes 811 Persian words appeared in English texts since 1225 CE.

== Reception ==
The book was reviewed by Karlheinz Mörth, Golnaz Modarresi Ghavami, John R. Perry, and Mousa A. Btoosh.
