= Shisha (embroidery) =

Type of embroidery

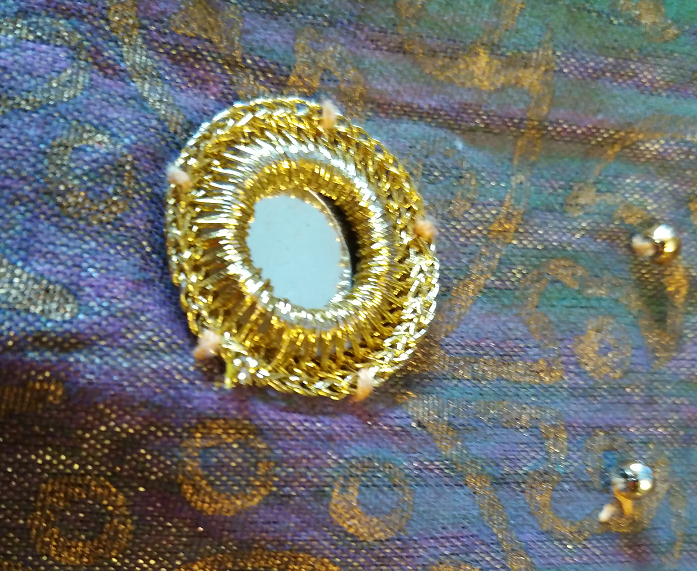
Close-up of shisha (mirror) framed by embroidery stitches

Shisheh or abhla bharat embroidery (Persian شيشه; Hindi: आभला भरत, ābhala bharat; Gujarati: આભલા ભરત), or mirror-work, is a type of embroidery which attaches small pieces of mirrors or reflective metal to fabric. Mirror embroidery is common throughout Asia, and today can be found in the traditional embroidery of the Indian subcontinent, Afghanistan, China, and Indonesia.

== History ==
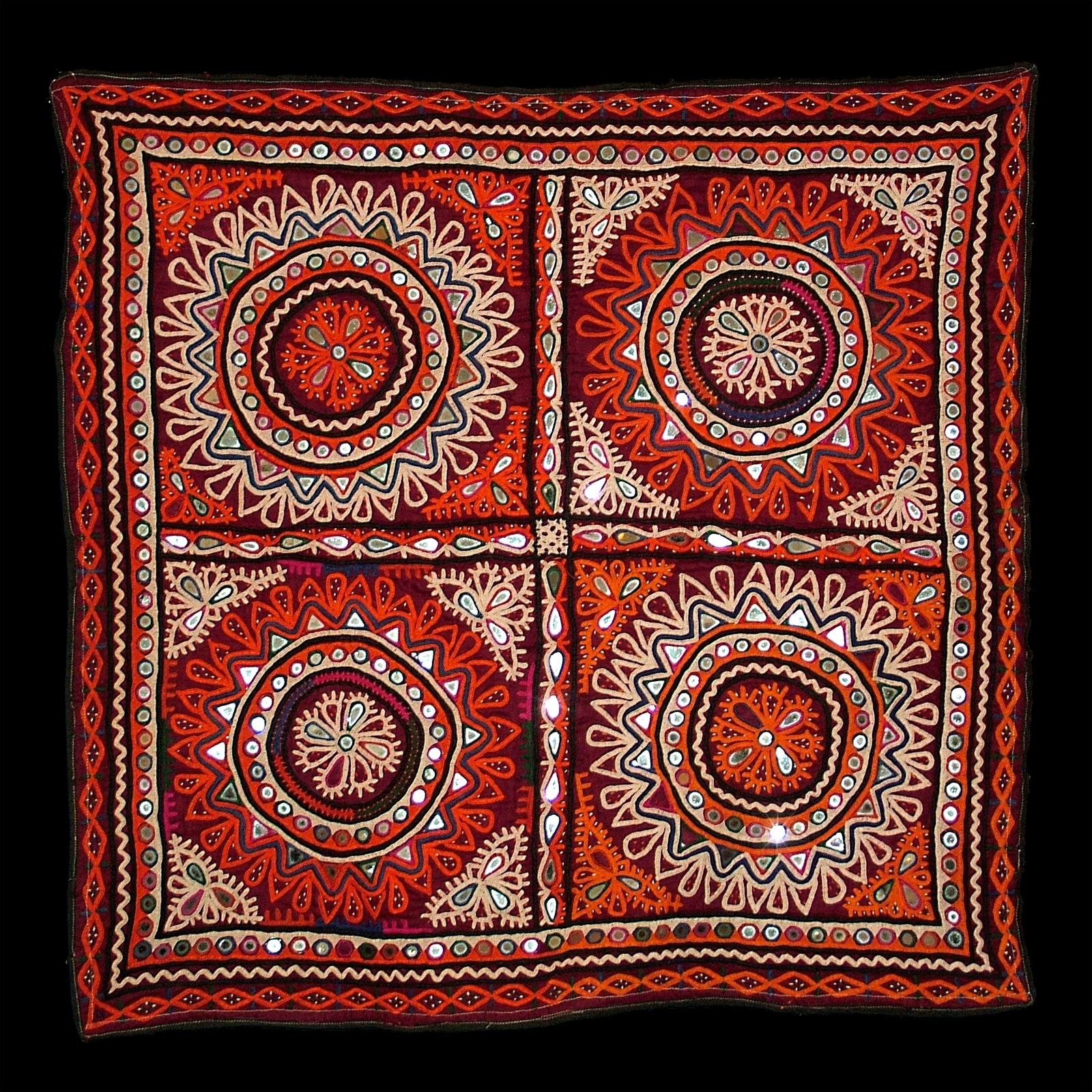
Abhala Bharat or Shisha embroidery from Gujarat

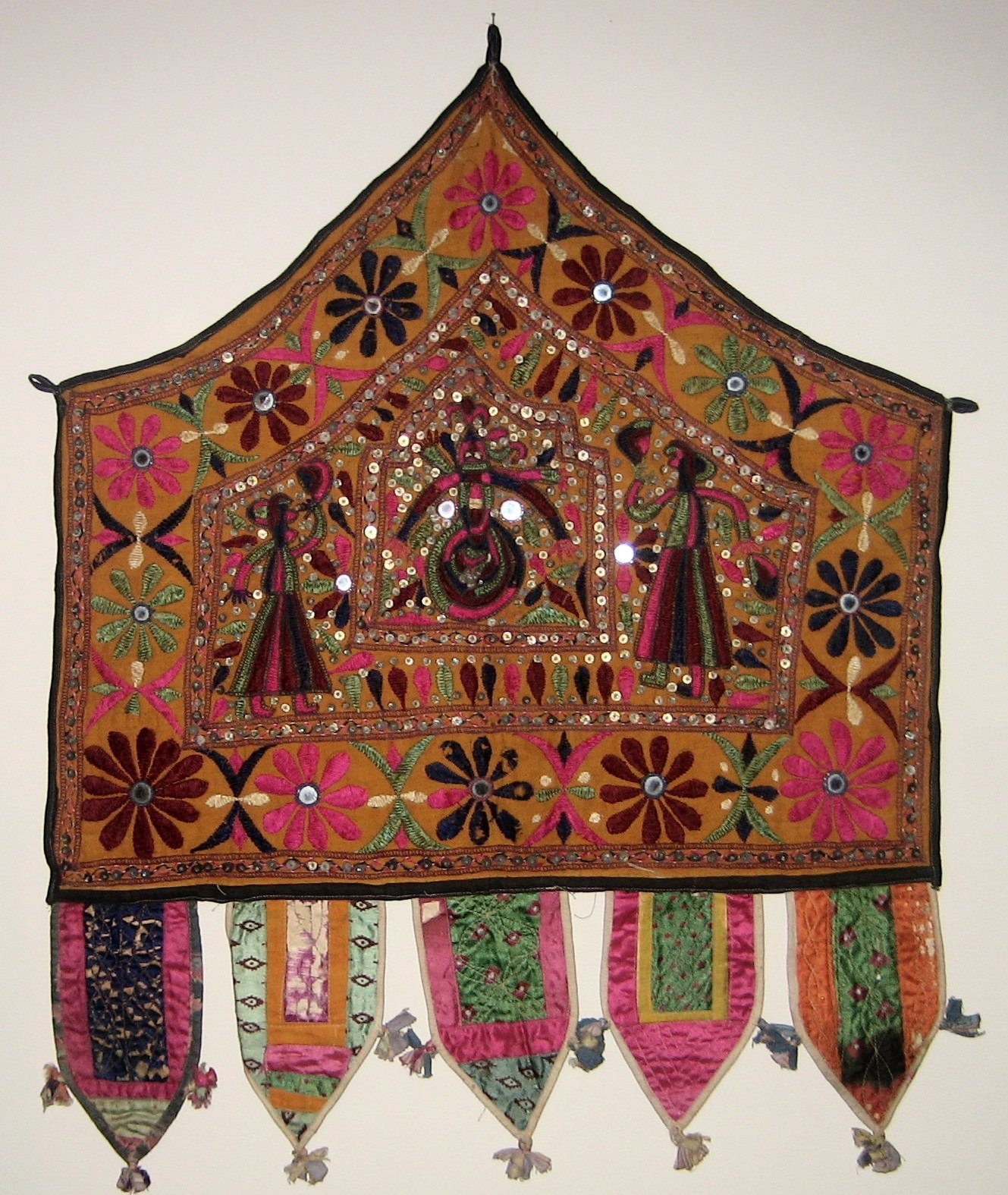
Altar Torana from Gujarat, 20th century, plain cotton weave with embroidery and mirror work, Honolulu Museum of Art

Shisha embroidery originated in the 17th century in India. People in lower classes mimicked the jeweled garments of the wealthy by decorating fabric with silver beetles' wings and chips of mica. When a process for manufacturing tiny mirror discs was developed during the Mughal Empire, these tiny mirrors or shisha were swiftly adopted for fabric embellishment.

Contemporary shisha work typically makes use of mass-produced, machine-cut glass shisha with a silvered backing. Today most craft stores in the South Asia carry small mirrors purchasable for use in embroidery, which come in varying shapes and sizes.

== Regional variations ==
Shisha embroidery is most common across southwestern Asia and on the Indian subcontinent. This type of embroidery lends a sparkling appearance to the brightly colored clothes worn in the region, and is very popular for use on clothing, hangings, tapestries, and domestic textiles.

=== Afghanistan ===
Both men and women adopted shisha embroidery from India. Using silk or cotton thread and cotton, sheepskin, or leather fabrics, they decorate clothing, prayer mats, saddles, and cloths for wrapping the Quran with abstract and geometric motifs such as vines, diamonds, stars, arches, and domes. Mirrors are surrounded by areas of heavy embroidery, particularly in the Kandahar region. Embroidery for export is often done by machine, rather than by hand.

=== Baluchistan ===
Shisha embroidery in Baluchistan, influenced by Islamic traditions, is almost purely geometric, using cotton thread on heavy cotton fabric. Traditionally, it made use of naturals dyes, resulting in muted color schemes. Shisha decorates both everyday and holiday clothing. Government training centers educate embroiders in shisha embroidery methods to preserve the traditional craft. Modern embroidery in the region is primarily created for tourists and export, making use of untraditional bright colors.

=== Sindh ===
Sisha work in Sindh is one of the most complex regional styles, showing influences from both its Hindu and Muslim neighboring states. In Sindh, cotton fabric is resist-dyed or block-printed before being embroidered. The shisha mirrors are attached and surrounded by filling and ladder stitches, as well as counted cross stitch. Popular motifs include trefoil, peacock, lotus, flowers, paisley, and delicate geometric patterns. Motifs and colors in the north are similar to those of Afghanistan and Baluchistan, while the motifs and colors in the south show a Gujarati influence. Shisha embroidery is used on many wedding garments, such as the guj, a tunic worn by the bride, and the bokhani, a scarf worn by the groom.

=== Gujarat ===
Gujarat shisha work typically depicts traditional themes of tragic love stories, battles, heroes, and kings. Shisha embroidery adorns clothing and wall hangings. Embroiderers in Kutch and Kathiawar are particularly renowned for their shisha embroidery. Kutchi embroidery is distinguished by the predominance of the chain stitch in curved or circular designs. In contrast, shisha embroidery in Kathiawar uses long satin stitches in square or triangular motifs.

=== Central Indian nomads ===
Some researchers believe that the tribes of nomads who inhabit Central India originated the practice of attaching mirrors, beads, and shells to fabric with stitches, and that these nomadic tribes spread the practice to other regions. Shisha embroidery in these tribes is unusual in that the fabric is almost entirely covered by mirrors and their stitched frames, with little or no decorative embroidery between. The Banjara and Rabari are known for their shisha work.

== See also ==
- Choli
- Sari
