= List of minerals of Pakistan =

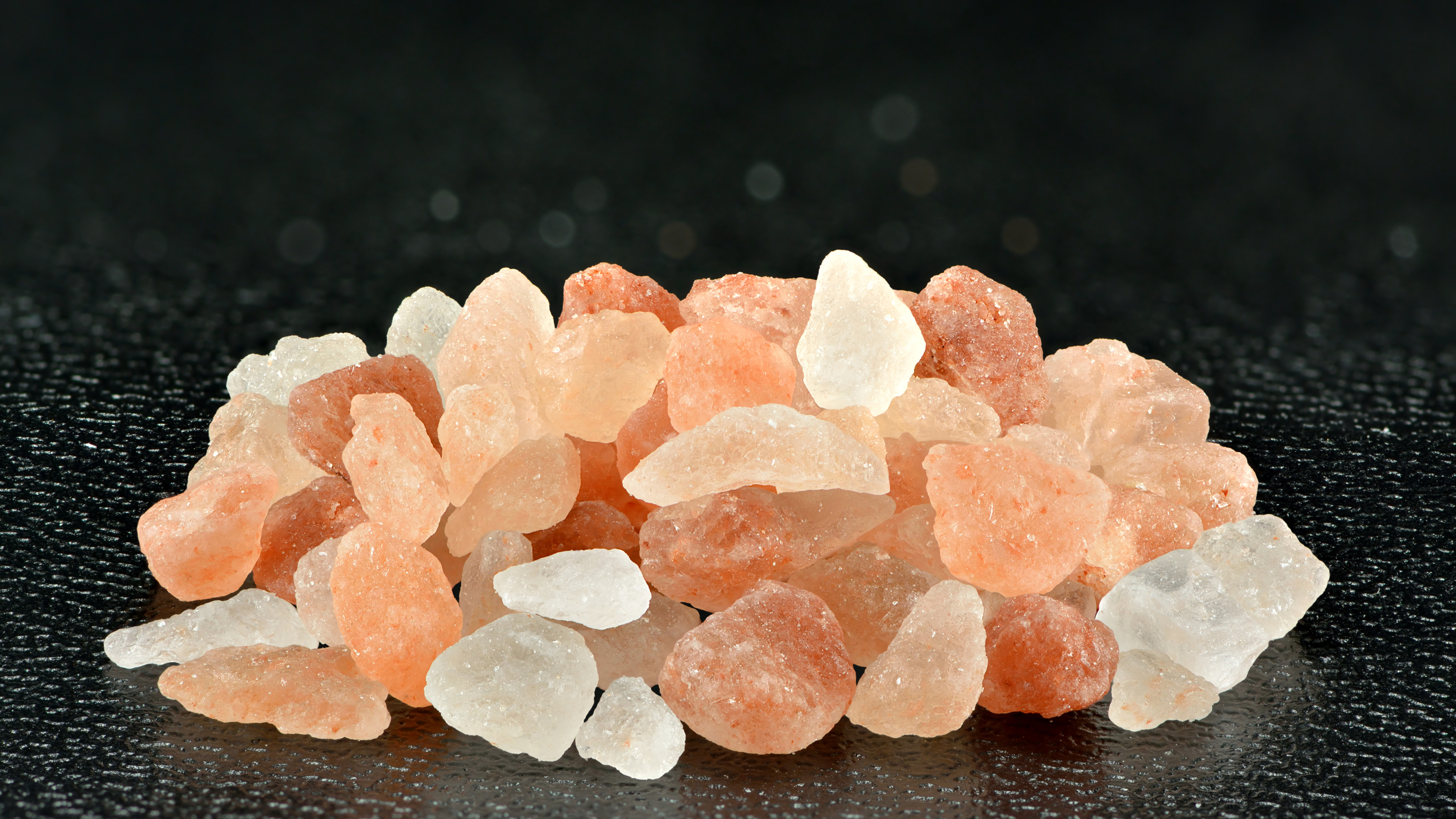
Himalayan salt (coarse, ⌀ up to 5 mm) from Pakistan

This is a list of minerals, both metallic and non-metallic found in Pakistan province wise.

== Mining areas ==
Minerals are found richly, in all of the Provinces of Pakistan. They may be mined in common locations or regions based on their popularity. Different minerals may also be mined in different regions such as the Hindu Kush, Himalaya, and Karakorum ranges.

=== Punjab ===
Region	Image	Mineral	Notes	Ref
Khushab District		Bauxite	The bauxite is best developed from Nilawahn to Khura in the south of the Salt Range. In general the content of alumina and silica has inverse relationship from east to west.	
Jhelum District		Bentonite	It is presently being extracted from Siwalik rocks found near Villages of Jalalpur Sharif and Dina in Jhelum District. Workable deposits also occur in Attock. Sandy terrain of the Pabby Hills near village Tainpur. Dina, Jhelum District have been reported to be the best places where economic deposits of bentonite are found.	
Mansehra		Calcite	In Punjab, deposits are found in the cracks of limestone in the form of veins. It is found in Attock, Rawalpindi, Chakwal, Jhelum, and D.G. Khan Districts. In Kala Chitta Range in Attock District, calcite is found in abundance in pure form.	
Daud Khel		Celestine (celestite)	In Punjab, the Celestite occurs as irregular veins over a length of three to four miles to the east and northeast of Daud Khel the mineral occurs in irregular veins.	
Rajanpur District, Chakwal District		Chalk	Chalk deposits are mainly formed in the limestone accumulation, which can be found in Rawalpindi, Chakwal, Khushab, Mianwali, D.G. Khan and Rajanpur District.	
Mianwali District etc.		Kaolinite (China clay)	China clay is also found in the Districts of Chakwal, Khushab, Mianwali, Attock and D.G. Khan.	
Salt Range		Coal	In Punjab Province huge coal deposits are found in the Salt Range. The coal found in Punjab is of sub-bituminous quality.	
Regions near Kalabagh (Mianwali District)		Dolomite	The main deposits include Barbara deposits of Kuch near Kalabagh in Mianwali District. The Dolomite deposits are also found near Datta Nala (about 11 km North East of Makerwal). Doya-Lunda, Normia and Punnu (Near coal mines of Mulla Khel) and near Buri Khel in Mianwali.	
Chakwal District Khewra Musakhel etc.		Fire clay	In Punjab important location of fireclay deposits are Chappri, Dhok Pass, Mouza Bazaar, Musakhel in District Mianwali, Chambal, Padhrar in Khushab, Kruli, Dlawal, Minhala and Wahali in Chakwal District, Khewra, Rohtas, Punan wal and Katha Saghral (District Khushab) and Kala Chitta Range (Bagh Nilab Area, Chhoi Area, Surg Area, Buta Area, Akhori Area) in District Attock.	

== Non-metallic minerals ==
- Brine
- Calcite
- Coal
- Ilmenite
- Kaolin
- Lignite
- Limestone
- marble
- Mica
- Rock phosphate
- Potash
- Pyrite
- Radioactive minerals
- Rock salt
- Silica sand
- Soapstone
- Sulphur
- Uranium
- Vermiculite
- Chromite
- Gypsum

== Gemstones ==
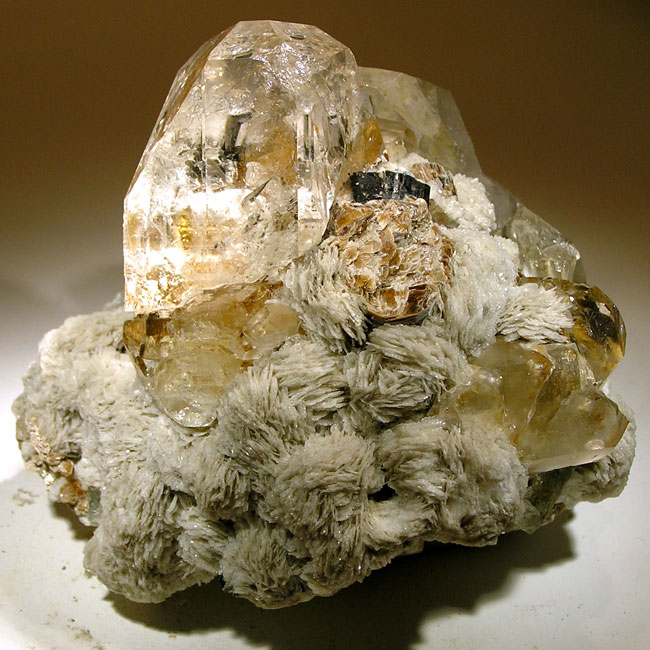
Topaz on matrix from Dassu in Gilgit Baltistan

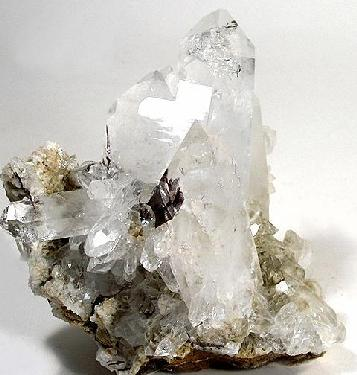
Brookite and Quartz mineral from Balochistan

Gemstones, also known as semi-precious stones or gems, are minerals widely used in jewelry and for ornamental purposes. Northern and western regions of Pakistan are rich in high quality gemstones. Some of the major gemstones are enlisted below;

- Peridot
- Aquamarine
- Topaz - in various colours including violet, pink, golden, and champagne
- Ruby
- Emerald
- Bastnaesite - rare earth mineral
- Xenotime - rare earth mineral
- Sphene
- Tourmaline
- Quartz of various types
- Diamond

The main mining areas of these gems are in Khyber Pakhtunkhwa and Federally Administered Tribal Areas, Gilgit-Baltistan, and Balochistan.

== See also ==
- Pakistan Mineral Development Corporation
- Gemstones of Pakistan
