= Crafts of Sindh =

Sindhi crafts

The crafts of Sindh and its craftsmen are held in high esteem and their works are notable both in Sindh and beyond.

== Pottery ==
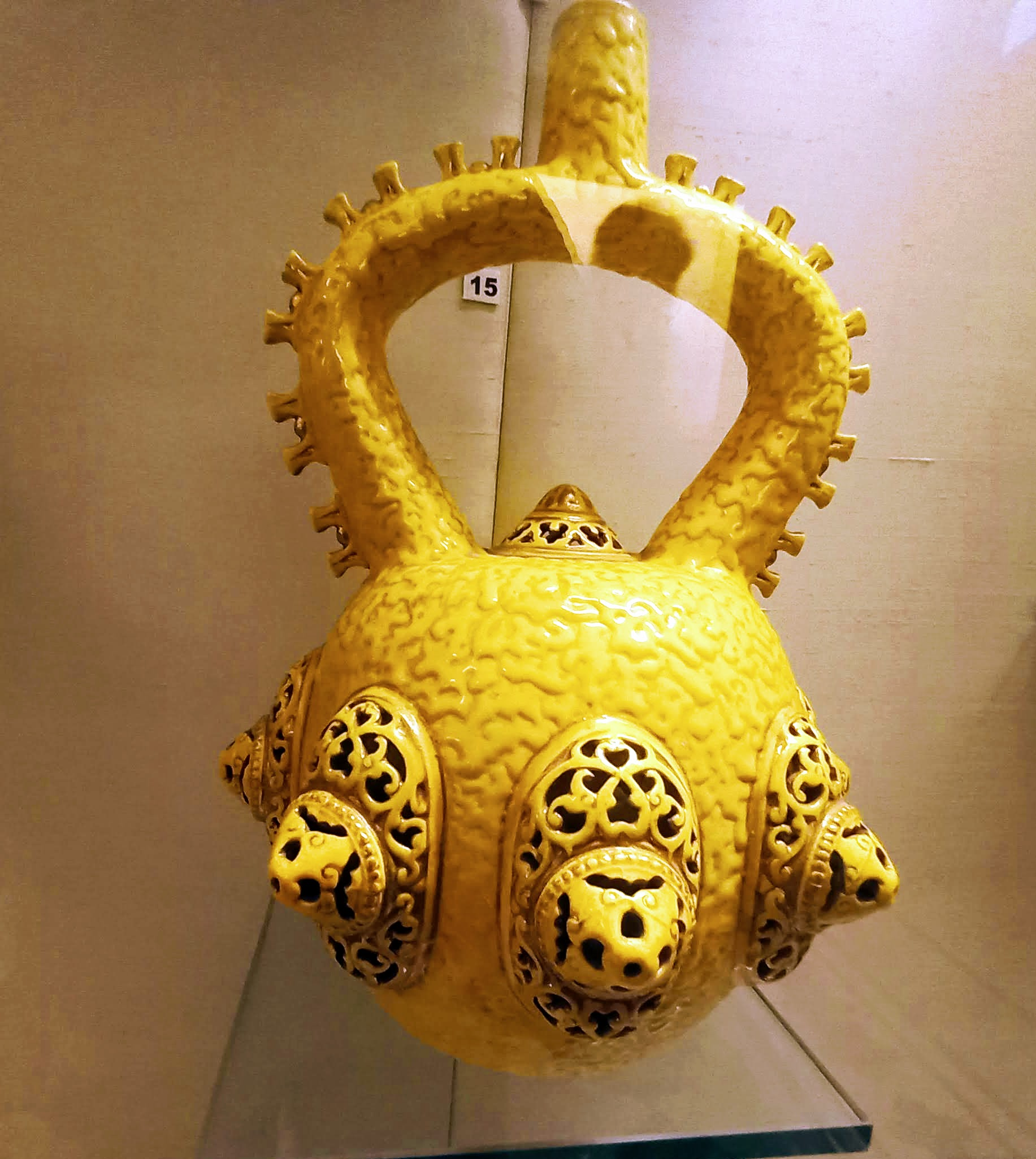
Sindhi pottery in Albert hall museum

The history of pottery in the Sindh region originates from the Indus Valley Civilisation. Vessels are painted with the colours of the rainbow and then glazed with earth called "channioh" which imparts lustre and brightness to the finished products. These vessels are used for both decorative and cooking purposes. In old days the utensils, pots etc. were made from pottery.

Kashi tiles have long been produced in Hala and Naserpur.

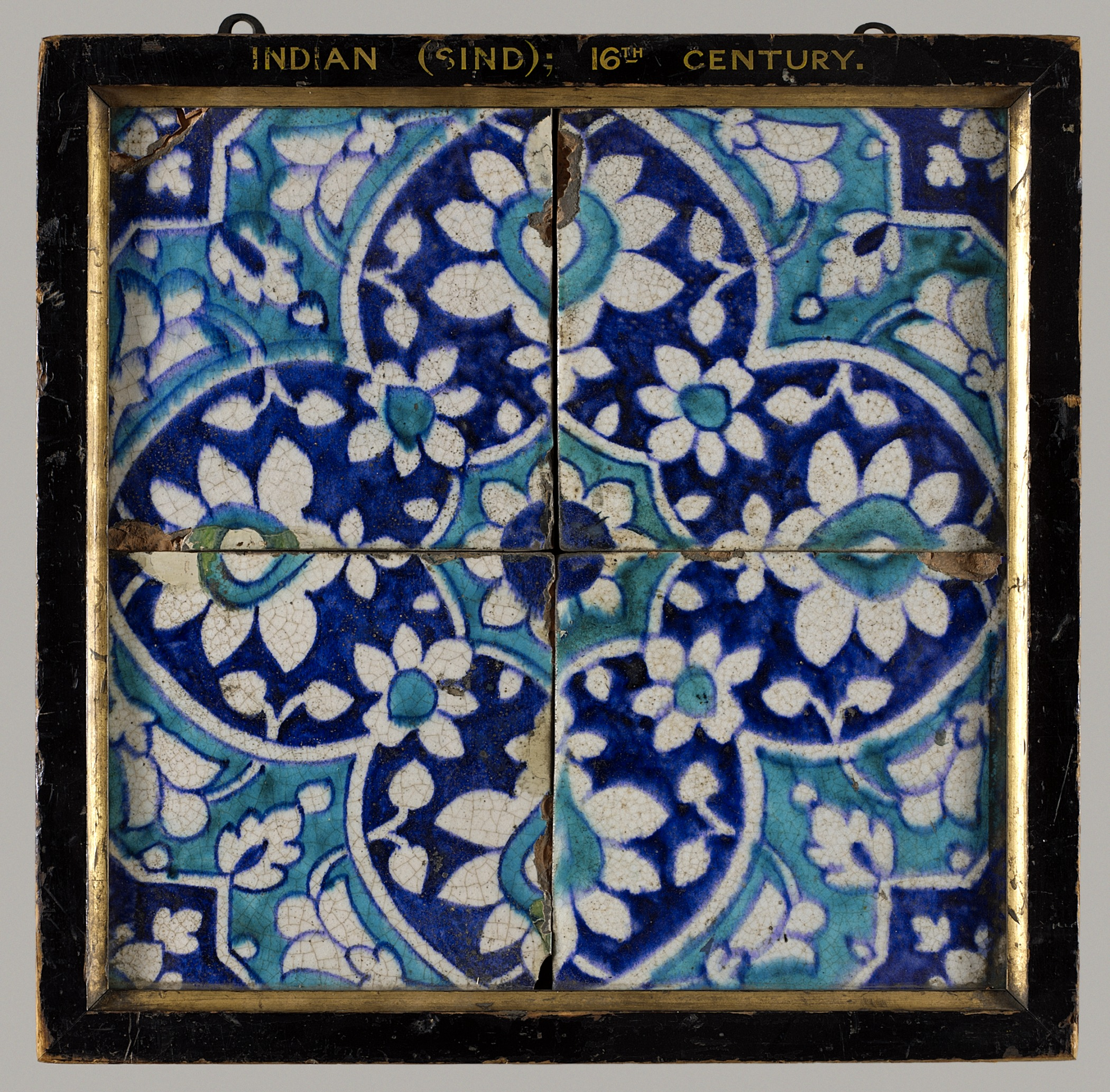
Kashi tiles of Sindh

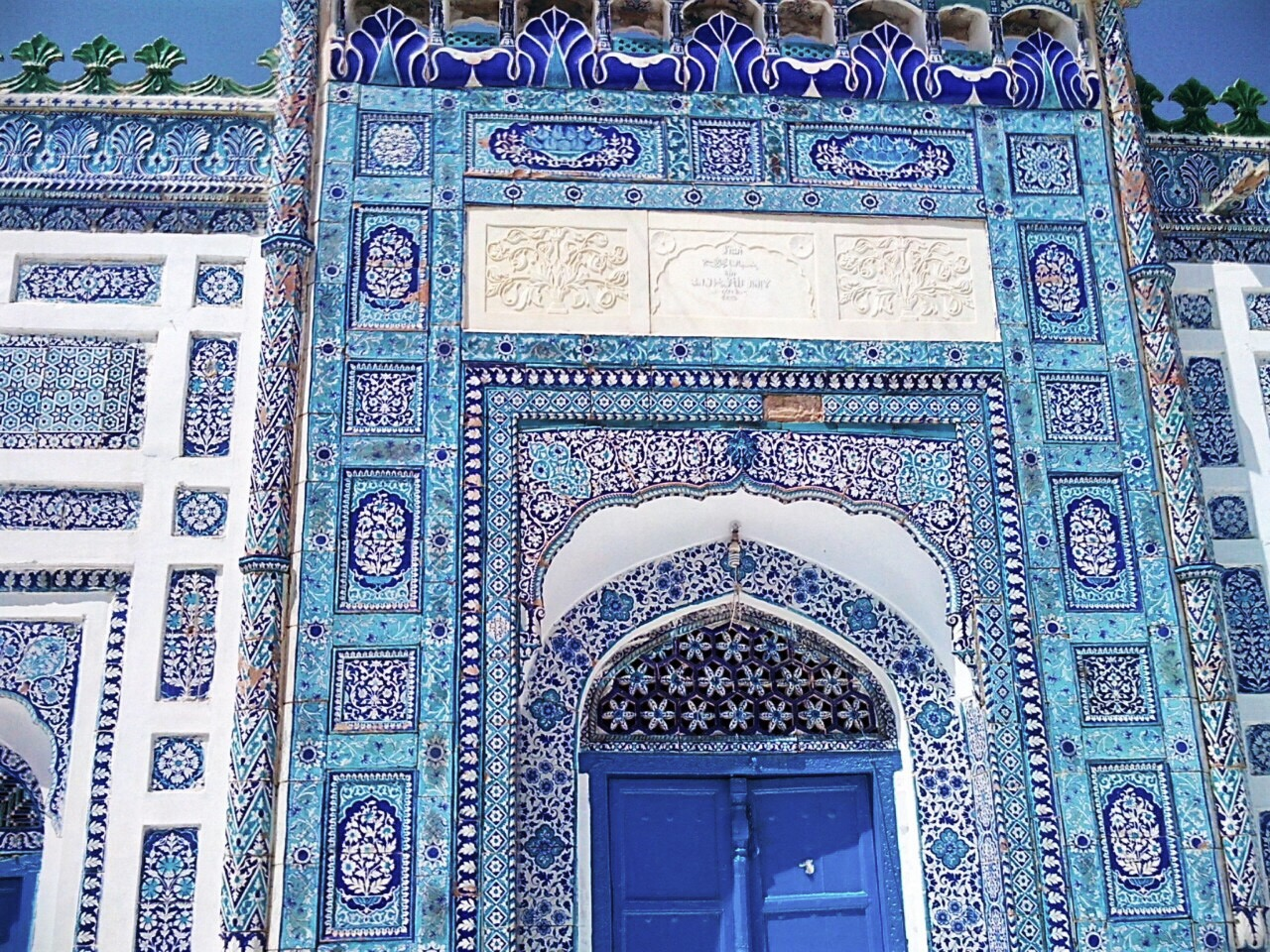
Door of Shah Abdul Latif shrine made of Kashi tiles

== Textiles and weaving ==
- Sindhi Lungee: made of silk, cotton and wool, in both bright and soft colours with beautifully woven broad borders of silver and gold thread. The use of bright, bold and vibrant colors with gold zari on the Lungi make its worth and significance.
- Sussi: a multicolored striped or checked cloth produced mainly in Hala, Hyderabad and Thatta, Sindh. Sussi is thin handloom fabric made of cotton, silk, or a blend of the two, with colored warp stripes. Sindh region was known for its production and exports during the Mughal period. Sussi was most often made with red and blue, blue and white, or green and white stripes, but other patterns were also produced. The fabric was exported to England, where sousaes were in great demand in the 18th century. Sussi are used for women trousers or for skirts.
- Sindhi khadi/thari shawls: Handwoven khadi shawls worn in winter, usually black and white with multi color stripes.
- Loi/Loee: Simple handwoven lightweight winter shawls, usually cream colored.
- Garbi: A silk-cotton blend fabric made with cotton in the warp and silk in the weft. It was a handloom textile material from the 19th century Sindh.
- Farasi/Pharasi: traditional Sindhi weaved rugs.
- Khes: traditional Sindhi shawls and rugs.
- Khatho: traditional woolen shawls, worn in winter to keep warm.
- Kaleen/Gilim/Galicho: Sindhi carpets made in Tharparker.

Other weaving and textile items are: Mashru, Darree, Oonr, Pachko, Nawar, Ailacho etc.

== Block printing ==
- Ajrak: a traditional block printed shawl of Sindh, ajrak displays many special designs and patterns made using wooden stamps, and dyed with both vegetable dyes and mineral dyes, madder and indigo are important.
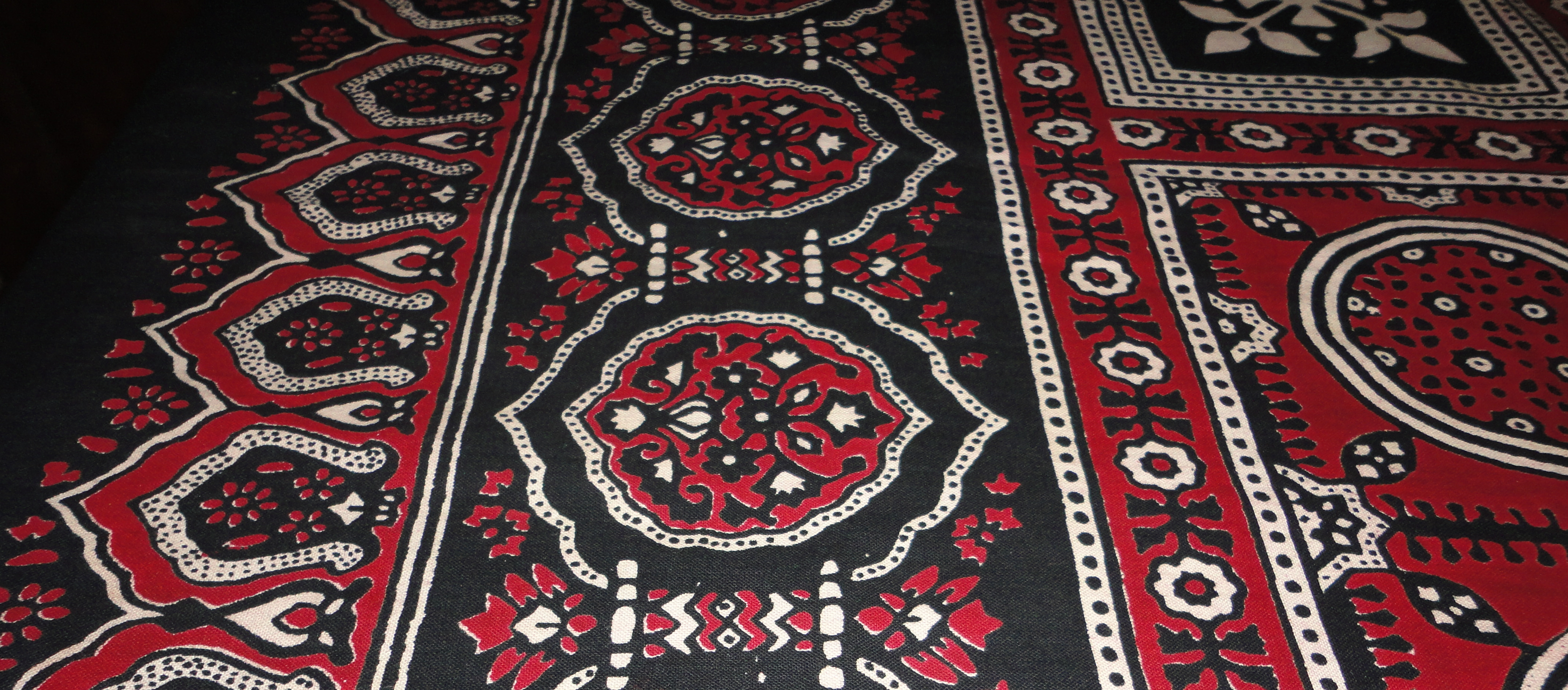
  Ajrak printed sheet
- Maleer: a block printed shawl used by women. Nowadays many designs of maleer are used as dress.

== Quilts ==
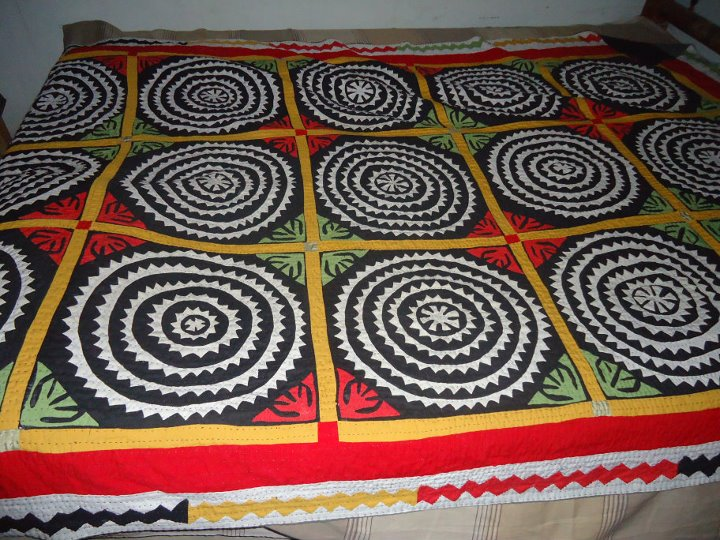
Applique "tuk wari" Ralli

- Ralli/rilli: a traditional quilt of Sindh.
  - The word ralli is derived from the Sindhi word ralanna, which means to mix and connect.
  - The ralli is made by from many layers of cloth. The lowest layer, called "tah", is made of bright and dark colors, with either applique or patchwork on top layer making amazing geometrical designs, patterns, motifs and objects on top layer. The layers are sewn together by simple running stitch called "kunh".

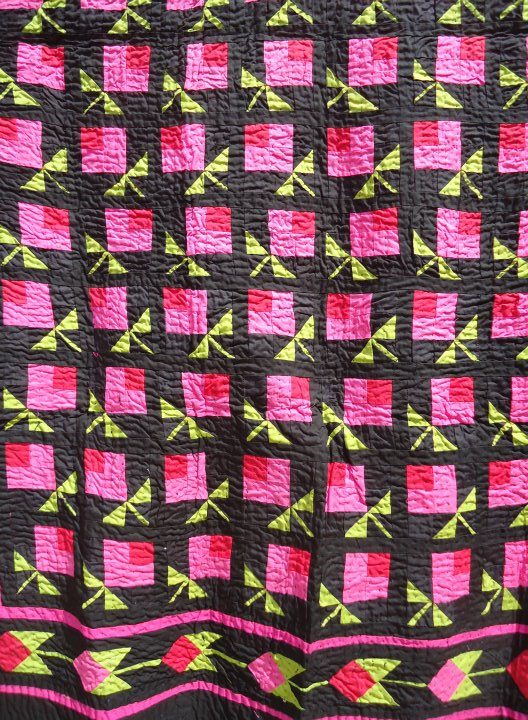
Patchwork ralli

  - Rallis are usually used as lightweight coverlet, and can also be used as a prayer mat (musallo), floor covering, or cover. Most homes in Sindh have collection of rallis, usually made by the women of house for everyday use. The rallis are also given as dowry to daughters. A small piece of ralli for babies is called "rilko". In Sindh, two different types of ralli are made, the applique (tuk) ralli and the patchwork ralli.
- Ghadelo: Traditional mattress used for sitting and sleeping.
- Sawarh: Traditional blanket used in the cold season.

== Tie-dye ==
Bandhni or bandhno is a tie-dye technique used on cloth, it is believed that bandhani art originated from Sindh. Bandhani is as old as the block printing art of Sindh, both arts were practiced in Indus valley civilization. Bandhani is traditionally used for making skirts, long wide veils and Sarees. Lār region and thar desert of Sindh are famous for Bandhni making.

== Embroidery and mirrorwork ==
Sindh is well known for its embroideries and mirrorwork. There are various stitches and embroideries throughout Sindh.

- Gaj: are solid embroidery with mirrorwork, pom-poms, sequins, cowries, seashells, beads and buttons over the woman's shirt it usually covers the area, starting from neck up to the stomach. It incorporates variety of stitches and colors. Sometimes, it is made on separate piece of cloth and then attached to the garment.
- Bujki: traditional Sindhi embroidered dowry purse for bride.
- Bokhano: a long embroidered narrow scarf worn on shoulders by grooms.
- Doshalo: a heavy embroidered shawl for groom on wedding day, that he wears over his shoulders.
- Gothro: traditional embroidered sack, used for putting stuff and materials.
- Thalposh: Coverlet, an embroidered cover for food, fruits etc.
- Jhalposh: another type of coverlet used for the foods items.

== Woodcarving ==
Woodcarving is done in Shikarpur, many intricate designs are made on wood for doors, beds, etc.

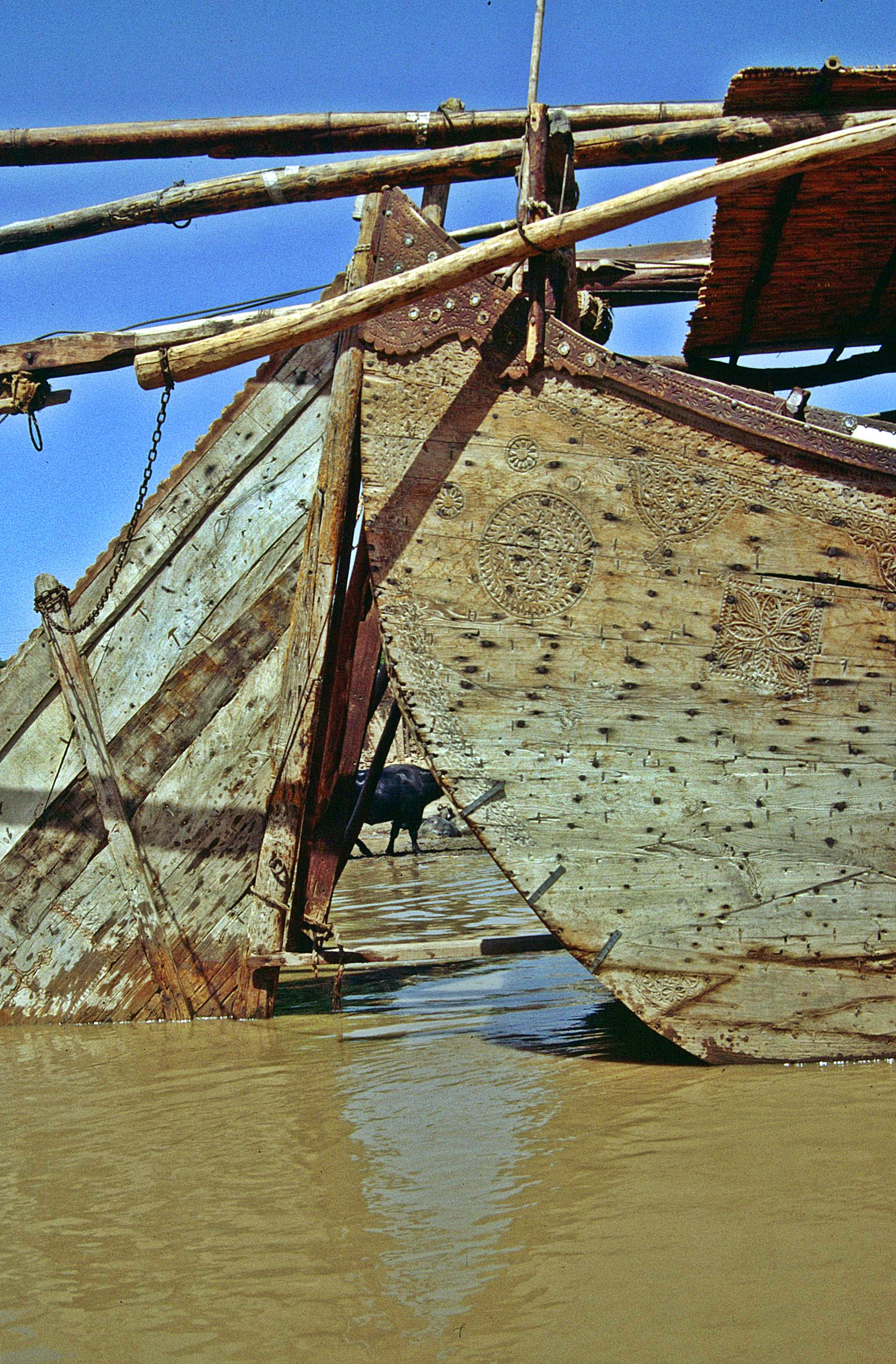
Woodcarved Sindhi boats in Sukkur.

== Lacquer work ==
Lacquer work (Jandri/Jandi jo kam) in Sindh primarily uses wood from trees on the banks of the Indus River. The wood is used for carvings and furniture, then decorated with lacquer work. The object was coated with a fine powder and polished. Traditional designs were outlined with paint and filled with bright and beautiful colours. After they dried they were varnished with shellac. A traditional swing called Pingho or Hindoro, traditional wooden beds Khats, sofas, chairs, vases, utensils and lamps are some of the famous items made in Jandri art.

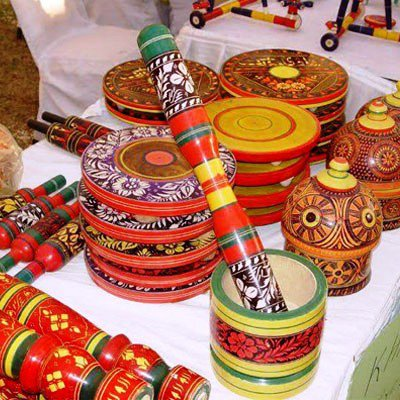
Sindhi wooden utensils with Lacquer Jandri work

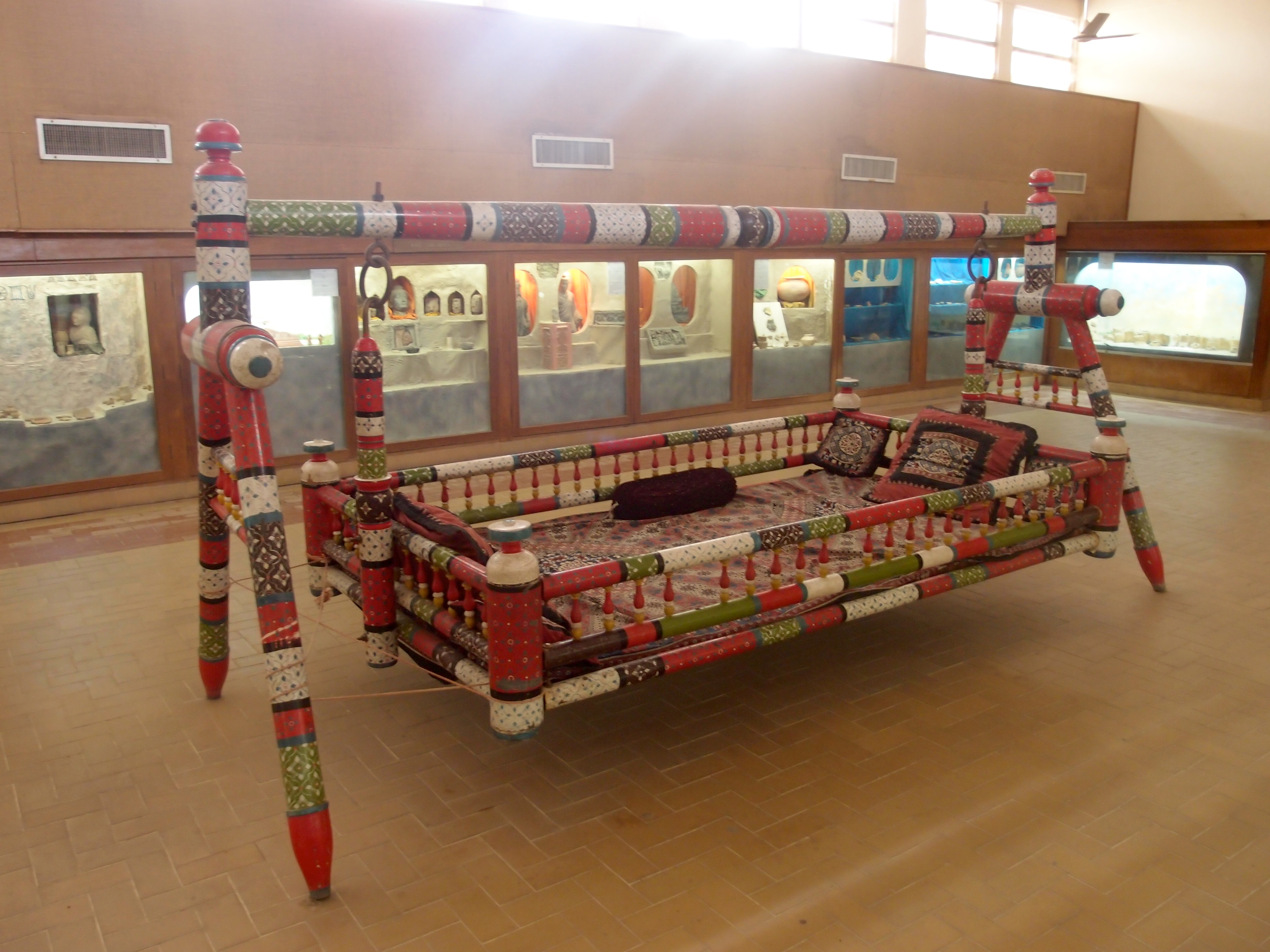
Jandi work Sindhi traditional swing (Hindoro/Pengho)

== Basketry ==
Khairpur and Sukkur districts are renowned for its date palm gardens. Apart from producing different date products, many locals make use of leaves and branches of palm trees to make numerous basketry products, the women of these districts, use date leaves, branches of plants, wheat husk, dried grains, and other materials to make amazing handicrafts.

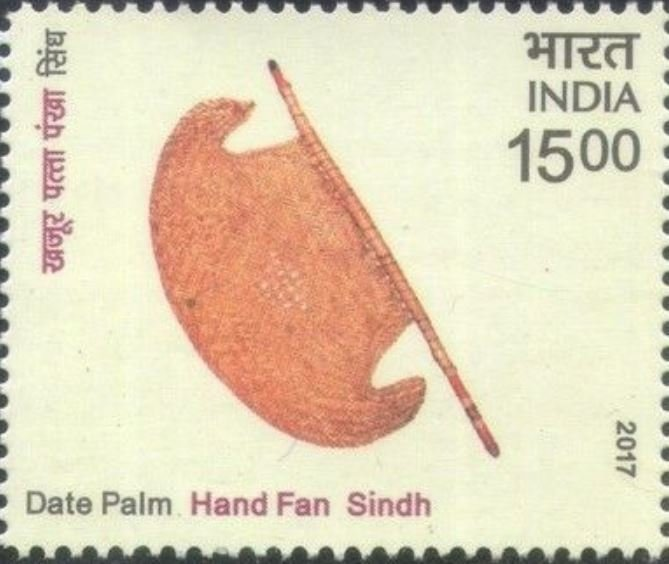
Sindhi Hand fan on stamp of India.

Many items are made like Chabiyu, Pindiyu/Dabeki (plate for bread roti), hotpots, mats, hand fans etc., these items are also decorated with colorful pom-poms, metallic thread and sometimes with mirrors.

== Leatherwork ==
Artisans manufactured many fine things in leather in earlier centuries. Coverlets, hangings, bed and table covers and ornamental shields and bucklers. The finest camel coverings called "Nuhs" and horse trappings in leather worked with silver thread were highly esteemed for their workmanship.

- Shoes: Sindhi jutti and Sindhi khusso and Mojri are traditionally made from leather with various embroideries, beads etc. on them. Sindhi mochis were famous for making these shoes.

== Jewelry ==
Jewelry: the jewelry and ornaments making craft of Sindh dates back to the Indus Valley Civilisation. Metals like silver, gold, bronze, copper, and brass, and other materials like "Aaj" (ivory), plastic, glass, "Kodd, Sippi" seashells, and Kanjhi are used to make jewelry in Sindh. In ancient times, jewelry was made with clay, wood, stone, iron, gemstones, and beads. Today, gold is the most desirable metal among Sindhis, but silver, plastic, and glass are used for everyday ornaments. Minakari, Moti, Maniya, Manka, Manak, Heera, Burra etc. The glass bangles of Hyderabad and plastic bangles of Thar are also famous. Traditionally, both Sindhi men and women wore jewelry but, in recent times, this trend has lessened for men. Jewelry for animals, such as cows, camels, and horses, is plentiful. Decorations and ornate pieces for vehicles and transportation also have a history, and can be seen in modern times on buses, boats, rickshaws and bullocks. The trend for wearing a lot of jewelries has been declining in Sindh. The traditional Sindhi jewelries are:

- For Neck: Duhri, Haar, Chandan Haar, Kundan Haar, Rāni Haar, Hass, Hassi, Hasli, Galoband, Nimbori, Thaeeth/Tāweez, Tay Pasaon Thaeeth, Galpatto, Katmāl/Katmāla, Māndhriya/Māddriya, Vailo, Varlo, Hānwri, Kanthi, Gāni, Niburri etc.
- For Ears: Wala, Dura, Waliyon, Jhumak, Leelum, Panra, Kanphul, Magar (Pālo magar, Jhālo magar), Jhamtiyun, Dāni/Dānwriyun/Sahāra, Jhumak Lota, Kurkun/Karkun, Seeryun, Dargal Alolk, Nasbi, Nabsiyun, Pokhāriyun, Panriyun/Palriyun, Kiwtiyun, Darbja, Bundha/Bunda etc.
- Arms, Forearms: Chooriyun, Chura, Bānhi, Kangar, Magali/Magili, Bāzuband, Bārkhiyun/Bānhrakhiyun, Bānhotta/Bānhutha, Hathriyun, Mangliyun, Hath Gajriyun, Katriya, Ponchiyun, Kulhan ja Patta etc.
- For Fingers: Mundri/Mundi, Chhalo, Khirol, Var etc.
- Head, Forehead, Hairs: Tiko, Tiklo, Chindi, Āali, Munhdāni/Munhadāni, Kandho, Jhumar/Pāso/Mirzo, Bakal, Tāj, Tāj Tikko, Kilp, Kilpri, Kaanta, Sirpatti, Sirband, Bindi, Tikro, Saggi/Chotti, Chotti Phul, Dāni/Dānwriyun/Sahāra etc.
- Nose: Nath, Nathni, Phuli, Phulri, Booli, Bulo, Veeti, Vaindo/Veendo, Koko, Heero, Raidari etc.
- Ankles, Feet: Payal, Pāzaib/Pājaib/Pājait, Jhānjhar, Kara, Chhehr, Noora, Nawār, Newar, Sāttiyun, Karriyun, Katiyun, Wachhna, Wachhona, Pair Chhala, Mundiyun/Mundriyun, Varna, Polriyun, Badi Bairi ji Kari, Kādhliya, Sātta, Phalodār, Rupai Wara, Kādhla etc.
- Hands, Wrists: Chambo/Chanbo, Hath, Dasti, Karra, Karriyun, Kangriyun, Vairh/Varna, Ānero/Ānhero, Hath Sakrro, Peena Kara etc.
- Waist: Chehlkee, Chehlpatta, Chhehl Meekro etc.
- Other Jewelries: Magar, Baiser, Bainno, Bandra, Tikili, Pasi, Paunchi, Vātriyun, Lakri, Jhorro, Chhāttla, Chhamar, Jhamar, Kundho, Vidhi, Kabchi patta, Kiriyun, Popat, Moman, Var'ra, Shinhmora, Alok, Pāttkanān/Pāttknān, Langar, Dāni, Padiyun, Chārgull, Ramjhol/Rimjhol, Oonra, Tiyor/Tewer, Gajriyun, Hānora/Hānwna, Anitta, Kātriya, Jhāba, Sabbi, Seriyun, Hom, Dargala, Maindphul, Por, Phalaiyun, Wendo, Phul, Chhatt, Pattiya, Annott, Ghanghra, Markiyun.

== Other Sindhi crafts ==
- Bamboo work: Bamboo sticks are used for making furniture, traditional curtains, and wall hanging with mirrors and decorations. Also Bamboo homes and local restaurants are made. In rural Sindh a traditional chair called "Moorho" and table are made from chusquea culeou bamboo, put together with reeds and straw.
- Beadwork: Beadwork (Motin jo kam) is used in many things, like jewelry, Sagi/Choti, keychains, pens, Agath, for decorations on busses and rickshaws.
- Applique work: Tuk jo kam is done on clothes and on other stuff.
- Camel barber art: the hair on camel's skin is trimmed to form patterns. This art of camel hair cut is done mostly in desert regions of Sindh, sometimes black color and henna is also used to make different designs.
- Copper bells: metal bells are made for cattle and other animals; these are used all over Sindh for animals.
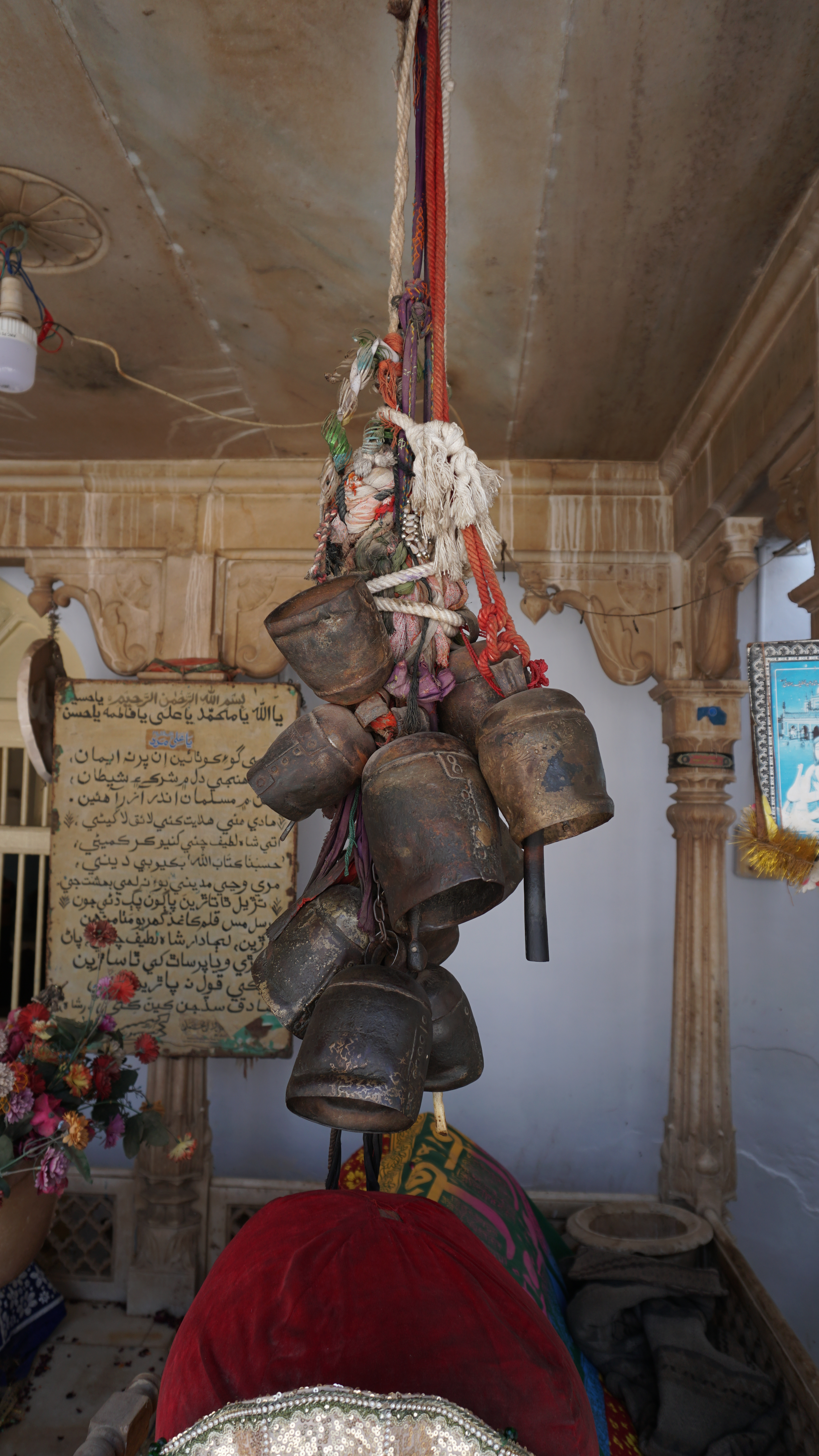
  Copper bells hanging above the tomb of a Saint (Pir)
- Ivory work/Shell work: In past Ivory carved jewelry for women and ivory carved wooden furniture and other ivory products were quite common in Sindh, ancient port city Bhambhore had worlds largest ivory workshop discovered in the world, also in Hyderabad and Karachi seashell products are still made. This ancient ivory work has been almost died, but seashell and plastic bangles resembling of ivory are still made in lower part of Sindh.
- Sindhi Khat: the Khat or charpai is a traditional woven bed of India and Pakistan, but Sindhi khats have their own uniqueness, these are made of different styles, patterns, designs and material. The small khat is called "Manjhi".
- Sindhi Traditional Doll: Sindhi doll called guddi/guddo(f/m) is traditional way of making dolls from white cloth sewn in human shape, and stuffed with cotton or small pieces of cloth, these were made to be played by kids. now a jute made dolls are also made.
- Sindhi Sagi/Choti: A hair accessory used by Sindhi and Punjabi women to tie their hairs into braids. It uses many colors, beads, pom-poms, shells, mirrors, etc. Traditionally, some Sindhi women used silver or gold jewelry on braids as well.

== Gallery ==
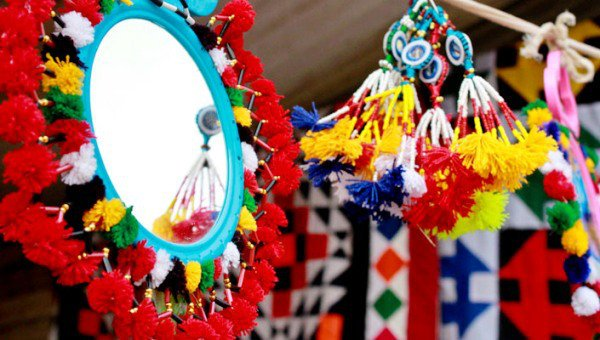
Sindhi handicrafts.

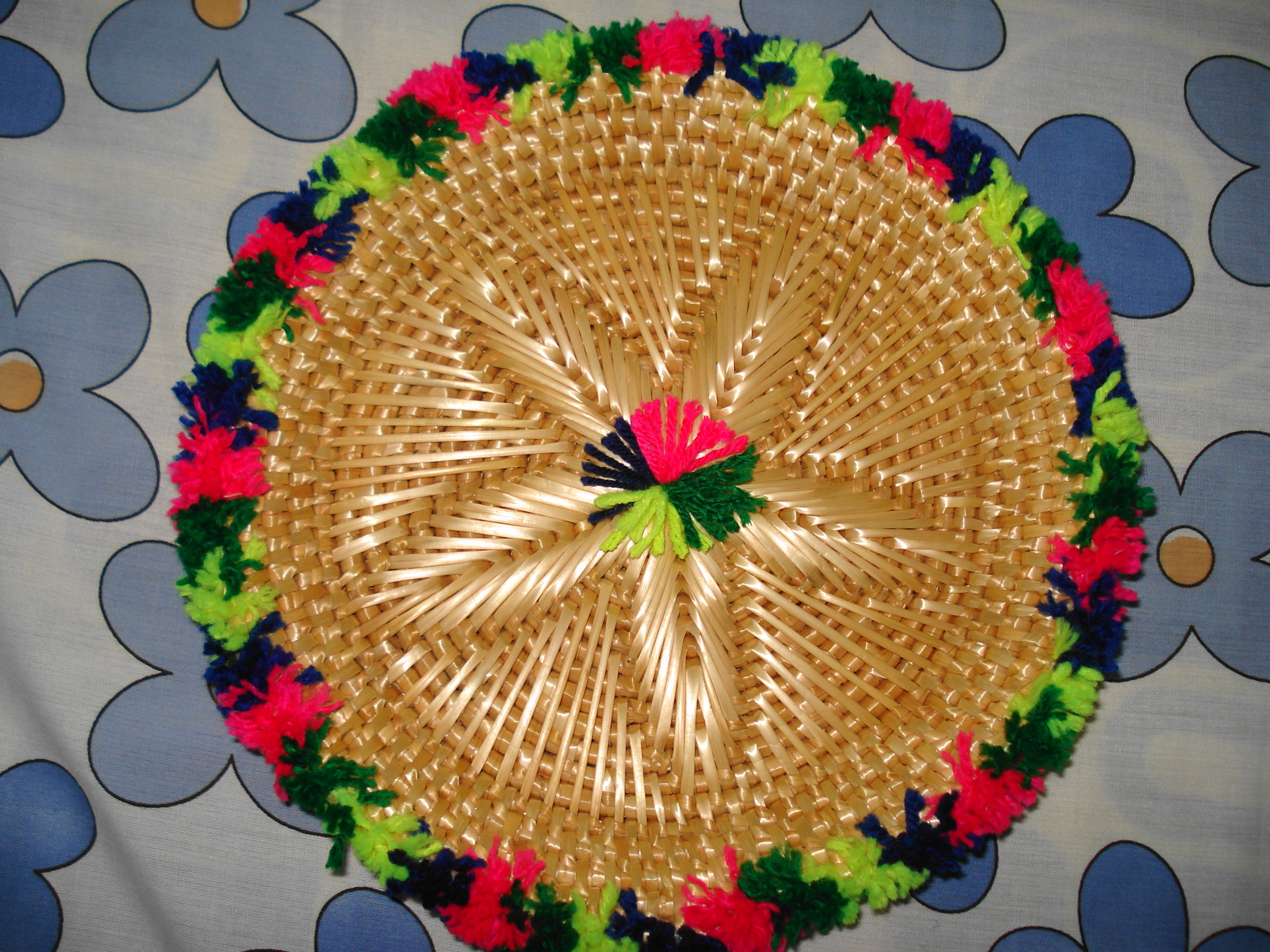
Sindhi handmade Dabeki/Pindi (plate for bread).

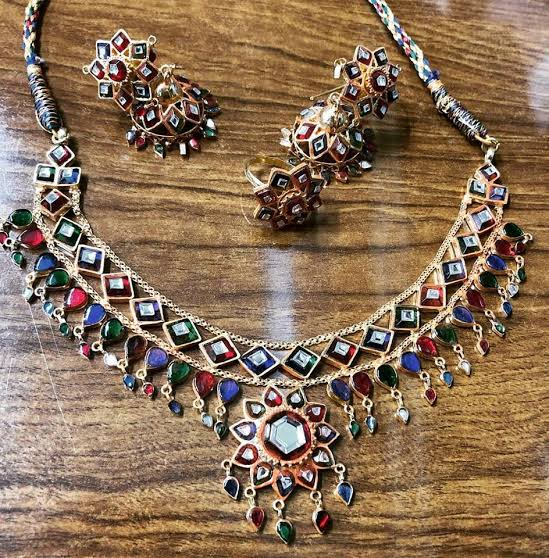
Sindhi Kundan haar necklace jewelry.

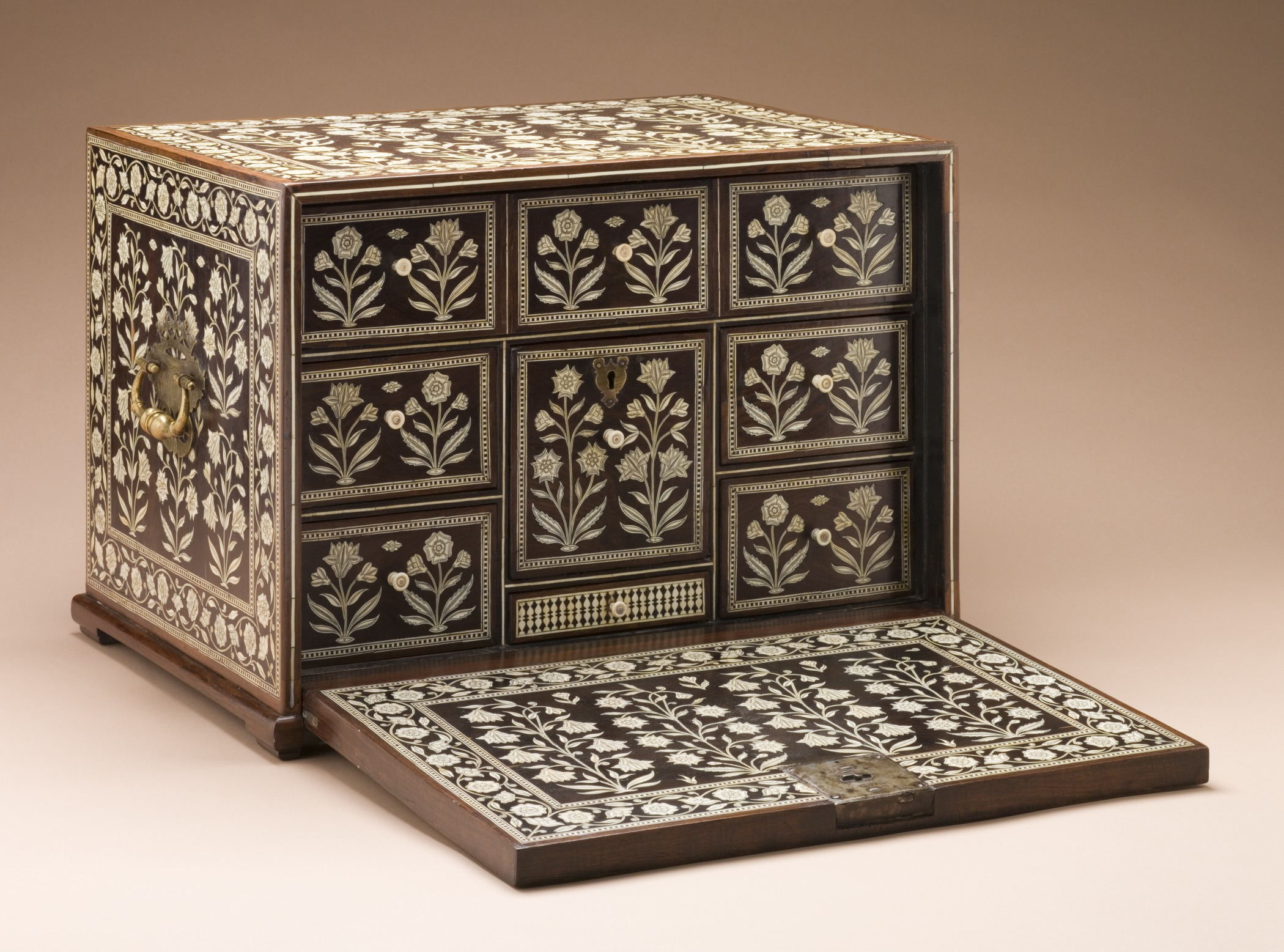
Sindh cabinet, circa 1650-1670

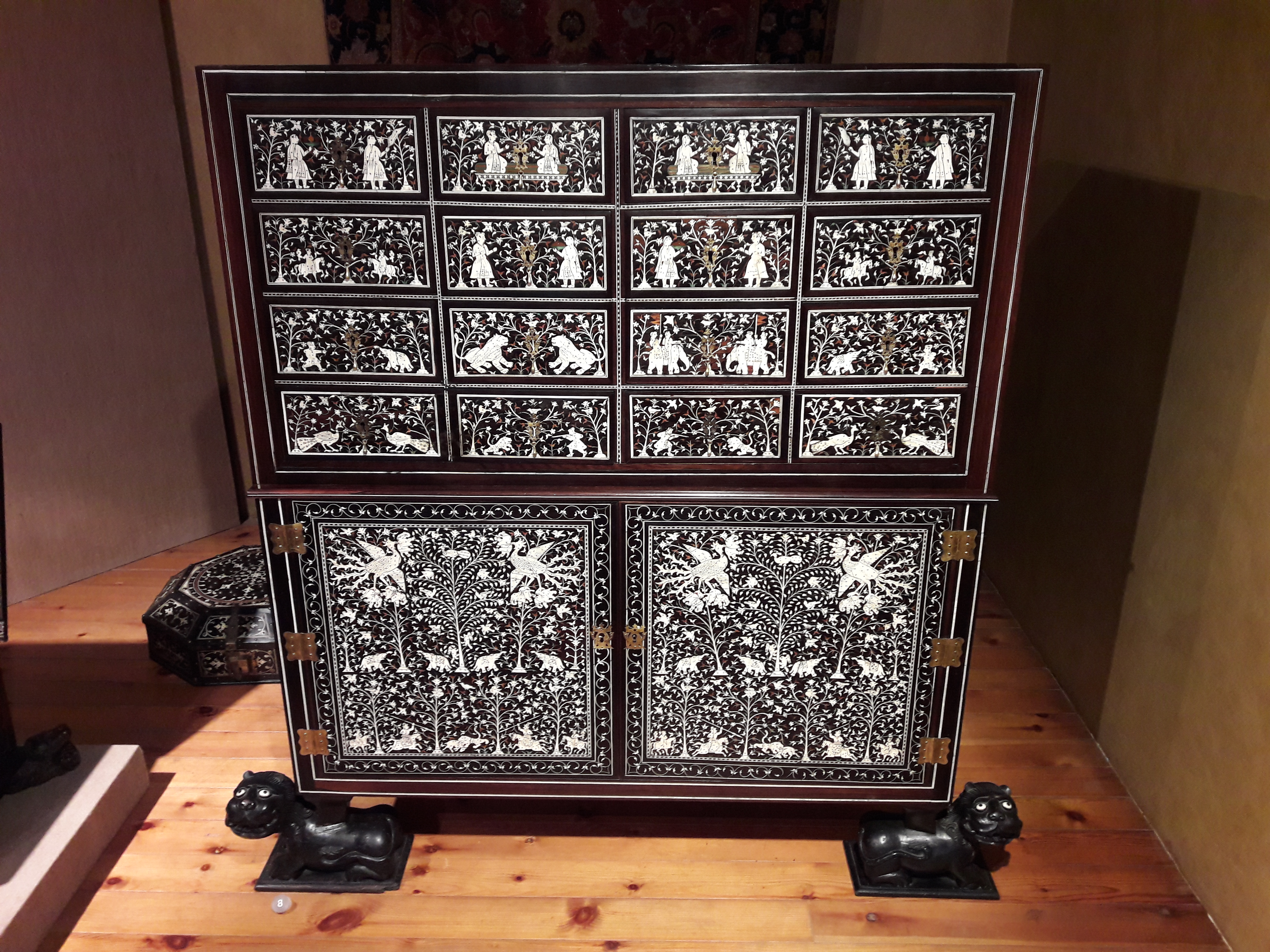
Cabinet on stand (Contador) Sindh, 16th-17th century, ebony, shisham, ivory and brass fittings, National Museum of Ancient Art, Lisbon.

== See also ==
- Pakistani craft
- Sindhi embroidery
