= Pakistani craft =

Aspect of Pakistani culture

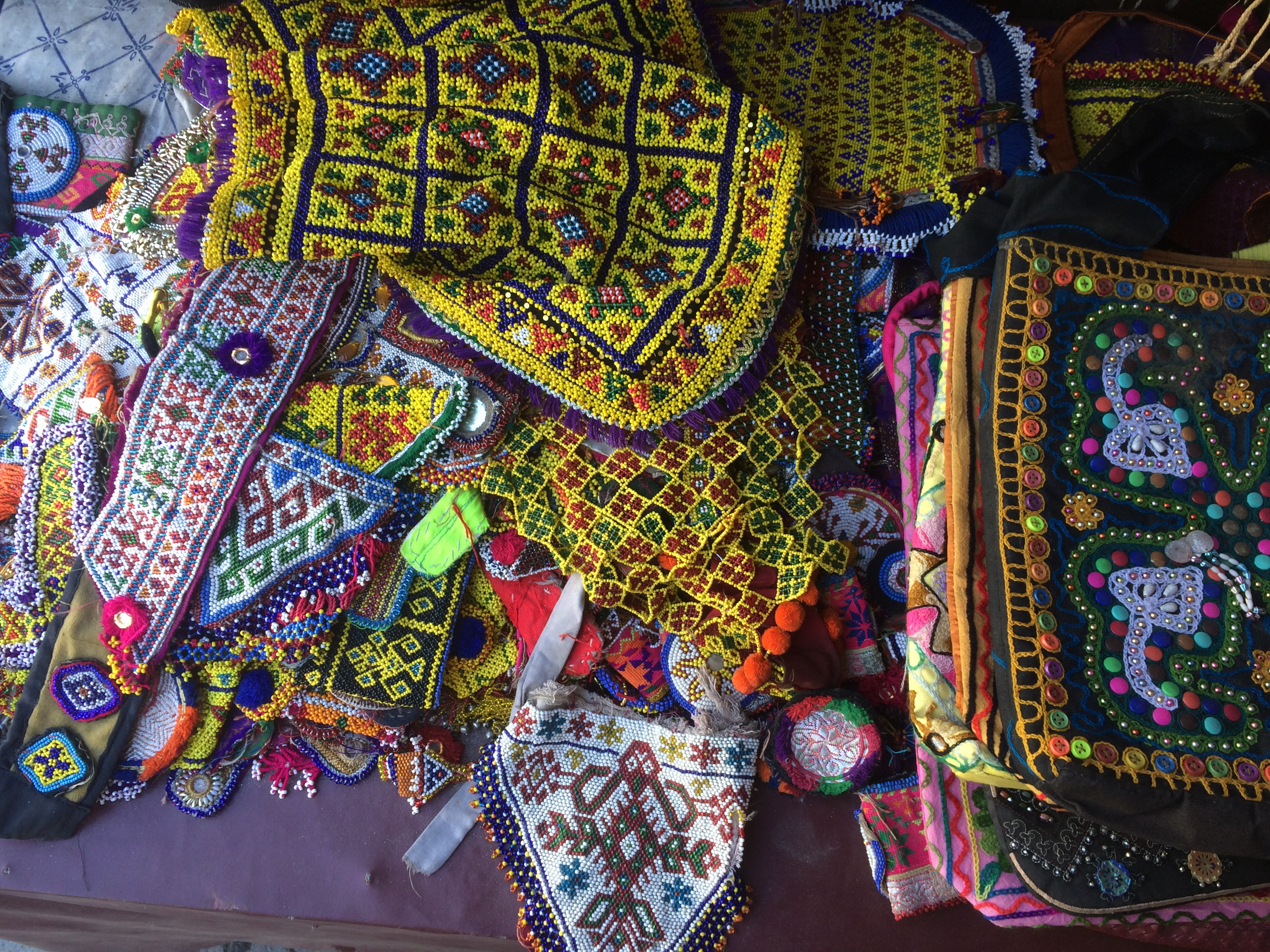
textile crafting by Naran people of Pakistan

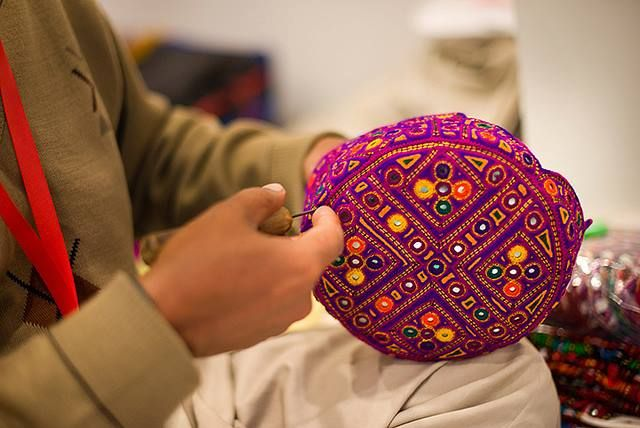
traditional cap crafting by Sindhis

Pakistani craft (Urdu: پاکستانی دستکاری) has a rich history and deep-rooted tradition. It involves the creation, design, and shaping of objects by hand or with simple tools, selecting the artisanal sills of Pakistani people. Typically crafted by individuals, groups, or independent artisans, this age-old practice employs traditional materials like brass, wood, clay, textiles, paper, and embroidery. Popular techniques include stone carving, working with sandstone and onyx, metalwork, pottery, and the intricate art of Ajrak, all contributing to Pakistan's vibrant handicraft culture.

== History ==
Pakistan has a diverse history of handicrafts. The entire timeline of its culture was studied through ages. However, it lacks actual dates and origin despite flourishing the great Indus Valley Civilisation through Pakistan. On the other hand, experts claim that 80% of South Asian craftsmanship are still found in Pakistan, and the former craftsmen were mostly from the different regions of the country. People of Karachi used to sell "jewellery, ornaments, textiles, furniture, leather goods" and other handmade items in markets that gives an impression of its historical existence.

== Crafts ==
Multan is one of the oldest regions in Pakistan where artisans create or decorate objects traditionally. Camel skin is used to produce camel-lamps, whereas camel bone is used to produce jewellery and decorative pieces. Wood crafts and blue pottery are commonly used by the artisans. "Multani Khussa", a type of shoes is created by crafting leather. Hyderabad, Sindh is particularly producing wooden furniture, sports goods and embroidery items.

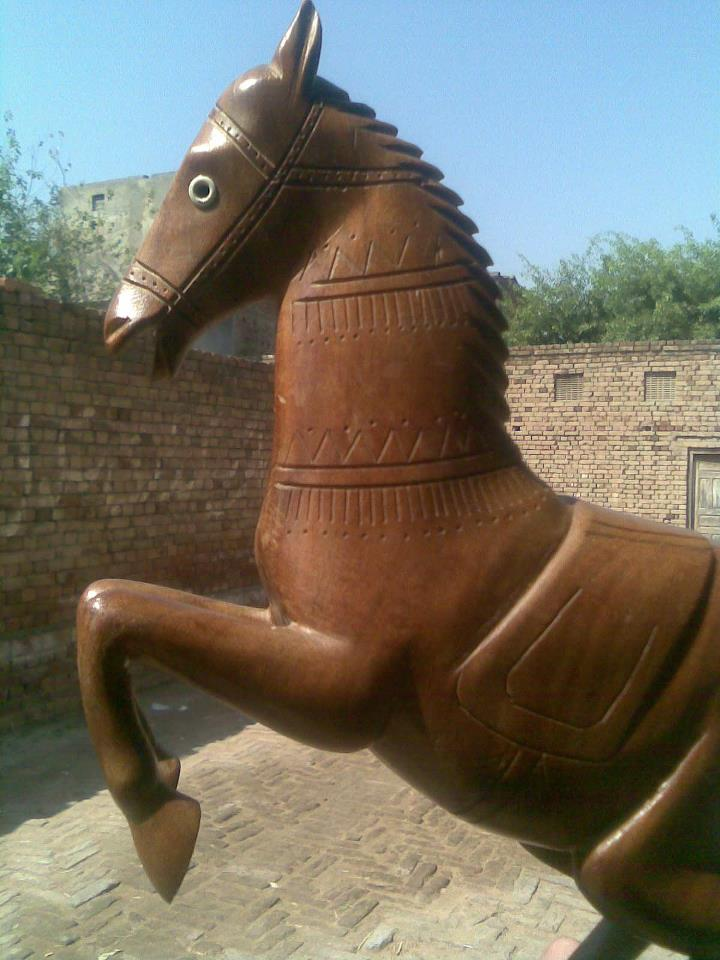
Sillanwali woodworking, a wooden horse

The artisans of Sillanwali town of Punjab, Pakistan produce several types of jars which are created from wooden candy and other traditional containers. Unlike other cities of Pakistan, it is known for woodwork handicrafts.

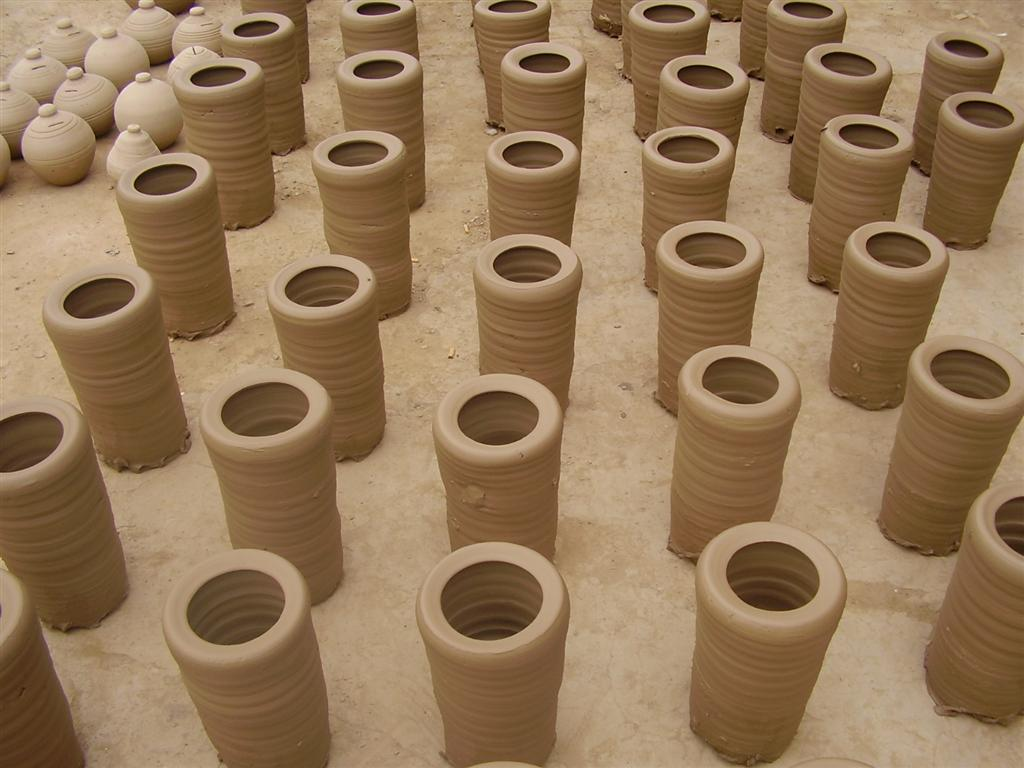
Matki earthen pot, a clay vase exhibition

Matki earthen pot is one of the handicrafts of Pakistan, especially in Rawalpindi and Islamabad are the main regions in country where people use and craft "matki" pots.

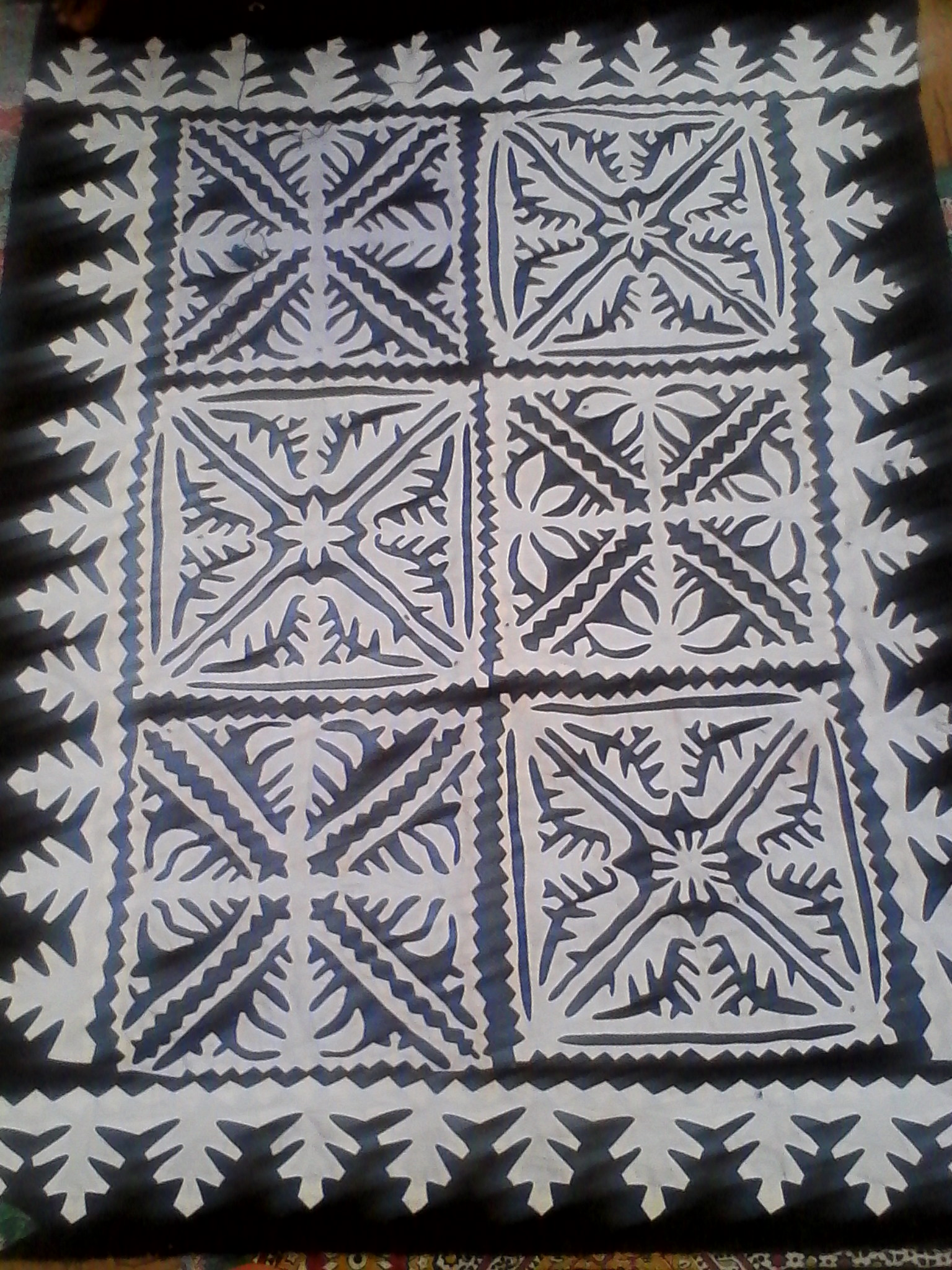
Ralli quilt, a traditional blanket of Sindh

The traditional blankets or textiles are mainly created by Sindhi artisans. They use simple tools to produce Ralli quilt.

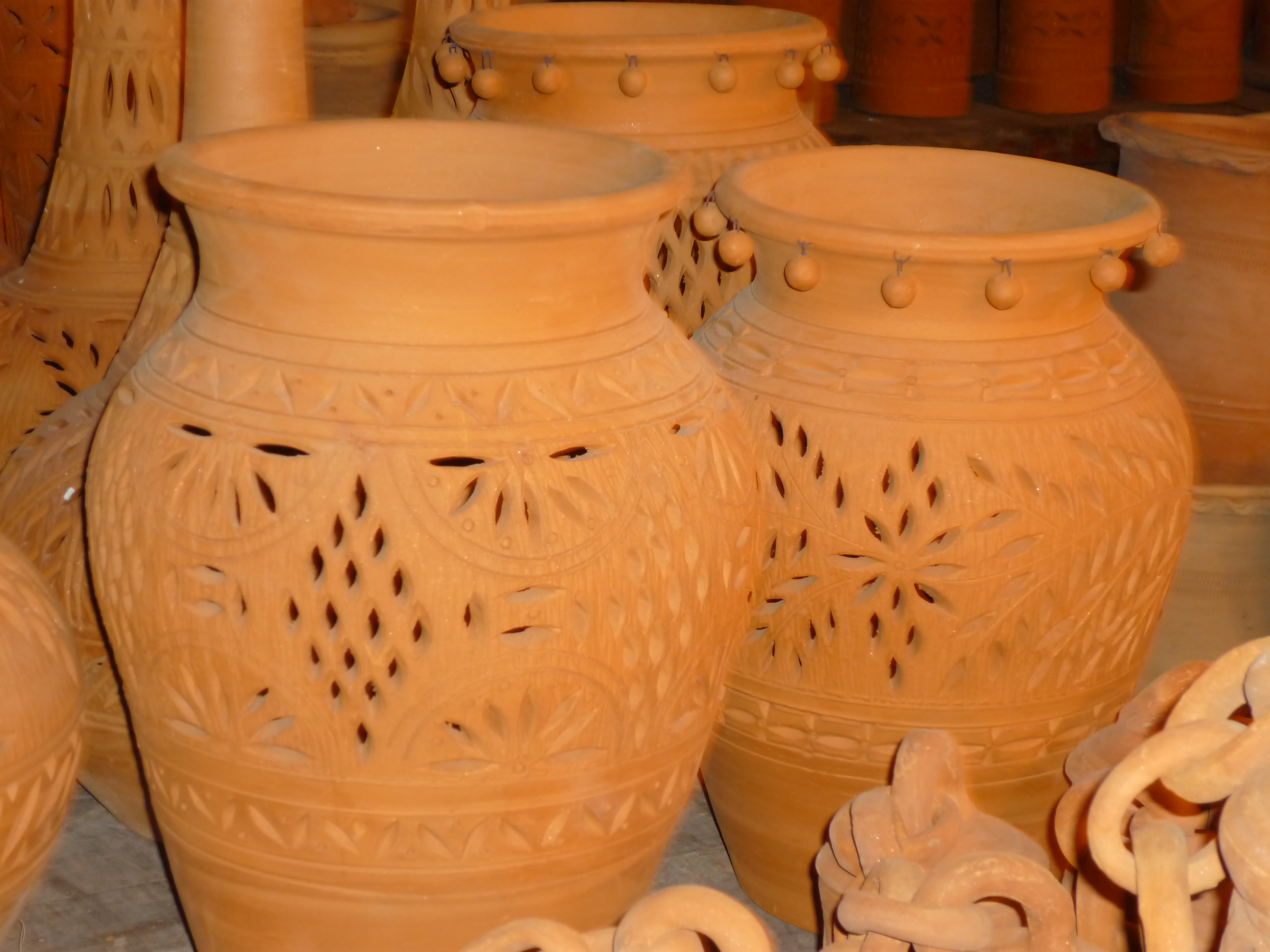
clay moulding tradition in Pakistan

Pakistani clay moulding dates back to British Raj when some of its regions, especially "Leh Nullah" artisan used to create clay utensils. However, this tradition in modern-era has disappeared. Before the Partition of India, people used to produce and sell clay utensils at the banks of river "Leh Nullah". Most of artisans were Hindus who later left the country and migrated to India.

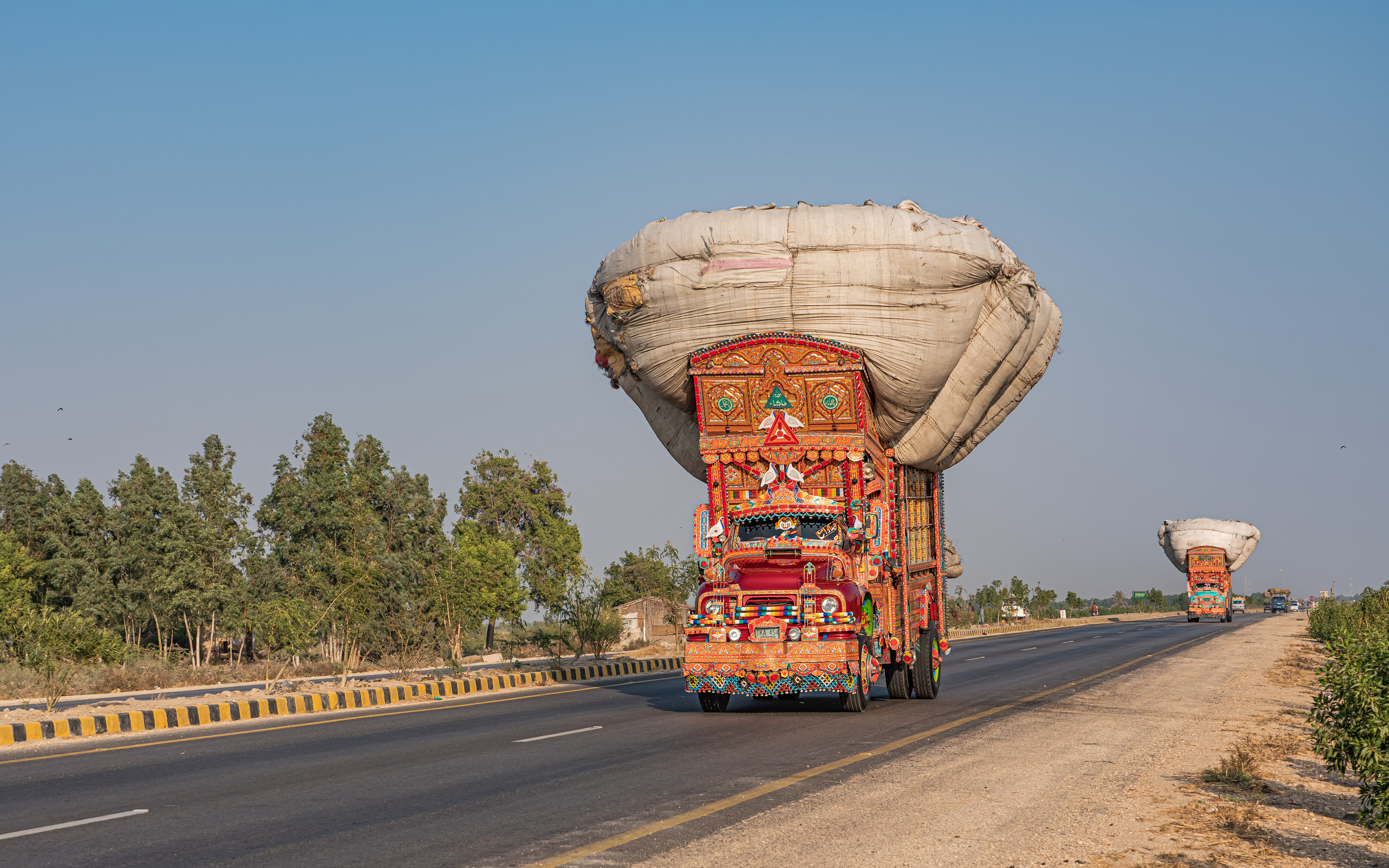
Truck art, heavily decorated truck near Karachi

Truck art is one of the prominent traditional techniques used to decorate vehicles such as trucks, lotteries, rickshaws with poetic calligraphy. It was used by the people before 1950s. However, it became known in 1970s when Euro-Americans and other foreign tourists came to Pakistan. They explored "heavily painted and decorated trucks and buses" found on the streets of Pakistan. In modern-day, this tradition is merely seen across the country. It primarily originated from Punjab Pakistan.

== Economy ==
Pakistan handicrafts sector is not playing significantly in its economic development. It possibly lacks international marketing assistance and low legislation attention. Crafts in Pakistan, according to News media was listed among the low-earning businesses as compared to other assets. It estimates an amount of $255 million annually. However, it plays a lead role in rural areas, especially among women, who produce several type of crafts in the country. Government of Pakistan has claimed that its handicrafts business is playing a vital role in its economy during the past 15 years. Furniture and textiles are among the key crafts of the country, mostly from Sindh, Punjab.

== See also ==
- The crafts of Sindh
- Gemstones of Pakistan
