= Gemstones of Pakistan =

Types of Gemstone found in Pakistan

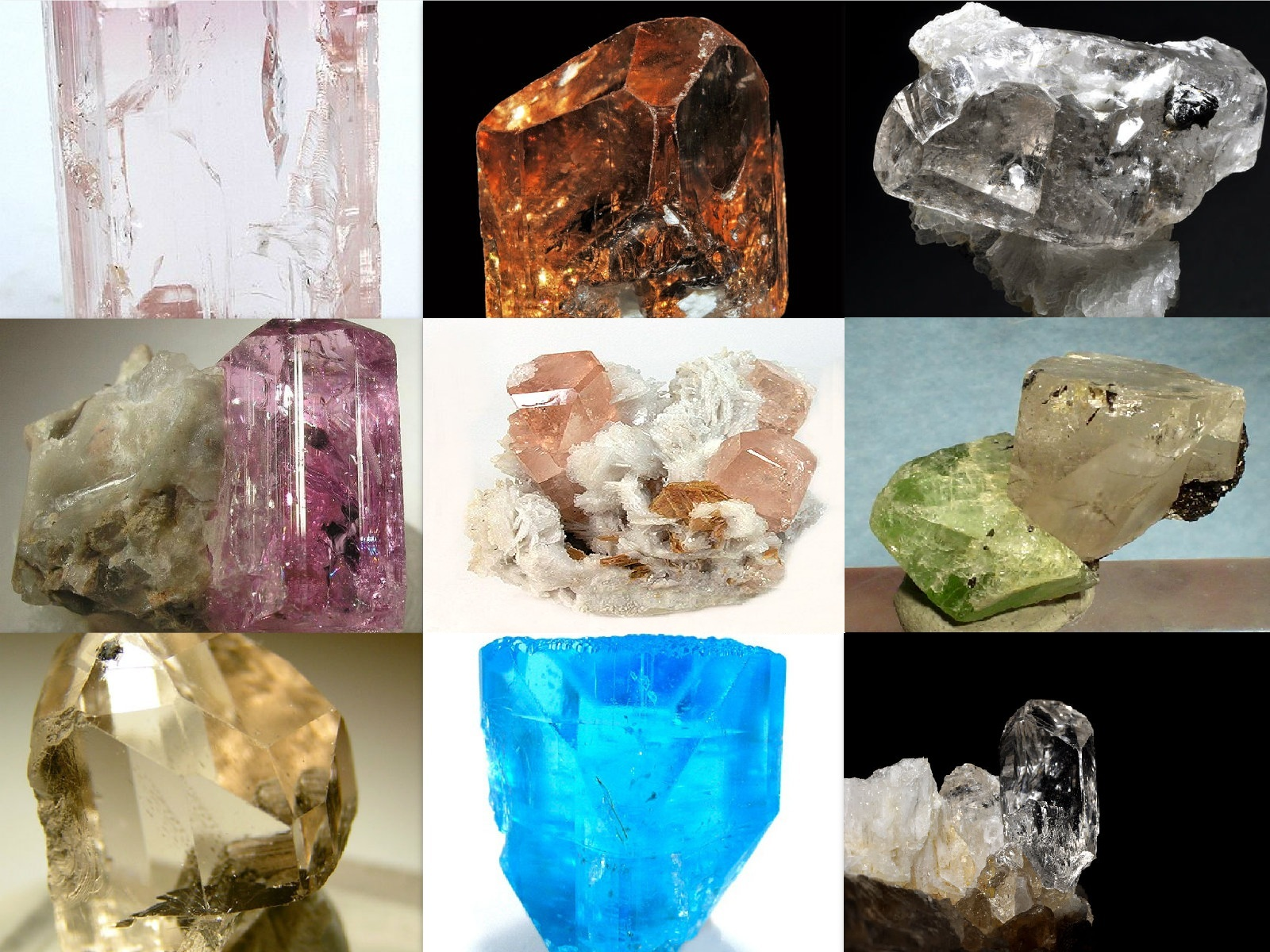
Various types of topaz found in Pakistan. 1st row: pink topaz, cognac coloured topaz, light pink topaz crystal with black tourmaline on matrix. 2nd row: rare purple topaz, champagne coloured topaz on albite, rare topaz and green hydroxylherderite matrix. 3rd row: naturally cut topaz, irradiated blue topaz, white topaz on matrix

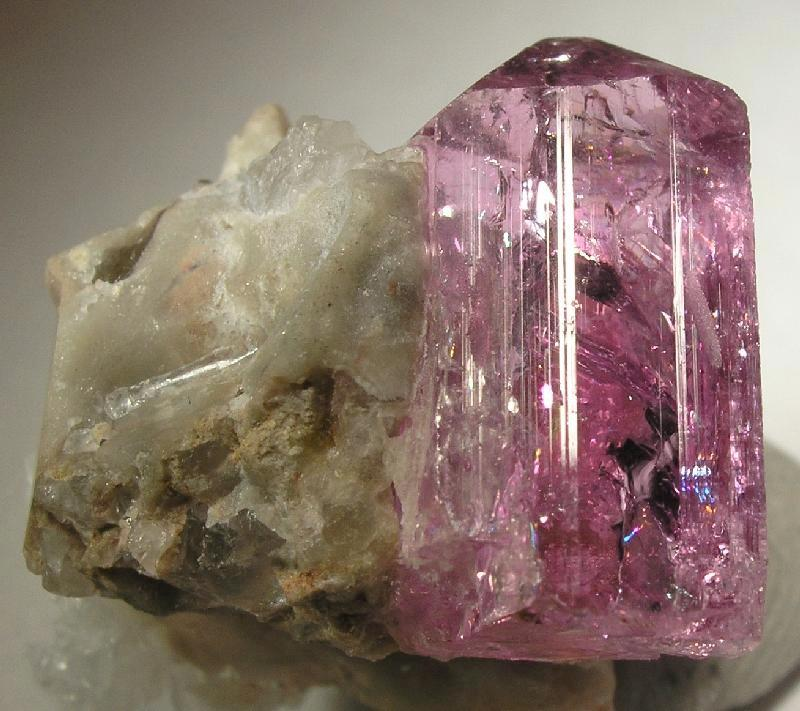
Rare purple-lavender hued topaz on a matrix from Katlang in Mardan District, Khyber Pakhtunkhwa

There are many types of gemstones of Pakistan. They can be found among the nation's three mountain ranges - the Hindu Kush, the Himalayas, and the Karakoram - in the provinces of Khyber Pakhtunkhwa, Gilgit-Baltistan, Balochistan, and the Federally Administered Tribal Areas. The gemstone industry in Pakistan has the city of Peshawar as its hub, and there are many companies working in it.

== Industry ==
In 1979, Gemstones Corporation of Pakistan was established to develop the gemstones sector in Pakistan, however in 1997 the corporation liquidated. Now a number of organizations are working in this sector including All Pakistan Commercial Exporters Association of Rough & Unpolished Precious and Semi Precious Stones (APCEA) and Pakistan Gems and Jewellery Development Company (PGJDC). The Pakistan Gems and Mineral Show is held annually in Peshawar since 1994; however, it has not attracted much attention from potential international buyers.

== Gem markets ==
The southern port city of Karachi was once the biggest market of facet and rough cut gems in Pakistan. However, after the Soviet invasion of Afghanistan, the gem market shifted to Peshawar. Peshawar became the hub of gemstones trade. Due to the long and porous border with Afghanistan, many gemstones from the country are now also found in Pakistan and since 1979, Peshawar is the only direct market for all gems found both in Pakistan and Afghanistan. Pakistan Gems and Jewellery Development Company regularly holds Gem Bazaars (exhibitions) in Quetta and Peshawar where gemstones attested by Gemstone Identification Laboratory are traded. In Islamabad, so far three such exhibitions have been held. In the January 2012 exhibition, around two hundred companies from Pakistan displayed their items. The third Islamabad Gem Exhibition was held in February 2013 where 80 national gem traders displayed their products.

== Gem testing labs ==
The government of Pakistan to has established gem identification laboratories in major cities of Pakistan to promote the gemstone trade in Pakistan. For this purpose, Pakistan Gems and Jewellery Development Company is working in Lahore, Karachi, Peshawar, Quetta, Gilgit, Muzaffarabad and Sargodha cities where the major share of gemstone trade exists. Since the inception of Pakistan Gems & Jewellery Development Company, the gemstone trade in Pakistan has seen a major uplift.

There are also some private gem identification labs in Lahore, Karachi, and Peshawar which have qualified gemologists working in their labs.

== Mining areas ==
Pakistan's western and northern areas are home to three mountain ranges - Hindukush, Himalaya, and Karakorum - which are home to all the minerals found in Pakistan. Some of the major mining areas along with their main gemstone yields are mentioned below:

=== Khyber Pakhtunkhwa ===
The province of Khyber Pakhtunkhwa has three large mountain ranges: Hindukush covers the area to north and north-west, Karakoram to the north and north-east, and Himalayas to the east. According to Bureau of Statistics of Khyber Pakhtunkhwa, 2568 tonnes of baryte and 85 tonnes of corundum were produced in 2005-2006 and 1416 tonnes of quartz was produced in 2006–2007 in the province. According to one source, Swat has reserves of 70 million carats of emerald, Mardan has reserves of 9 million carats of pink topaz and Kohistan has 10 million carats worth of reserves of peridot.

Region	Image	Gemstones	Notes	Ref
Swat		Emerald, quartz, and epidote	Various types of quartz are found in the region. The image shows a specimen of aquamarine and emerald on quartz from Swat valley.	
Dir		Corundum and quartz	The image shows pink and purple crystals of corundum.	
Mansehra		Corundum and smoky quartz	The image shows aquamarine on smokey quartz.	
Kohistan		Peridot	The image shows a cluster of lime-green peridot crystals from Soppat in Kohistan.	
Peshawar District		Quartz, xenotime, and bastnaesite	Quartz from the region include Astrophyllite and Riebeckite fibers. The image shows bastnaesite crystal infused with rutile.	

=== Tribal areas ===
The Federally Administered Tribal Areas are strategically located between the Afghanistan and Khyber Pakhtunkhwa province of Pakistan. The region is mostly dry and barren with hilly northern Bajaur and Mohmand agencies. In the central agencies of Khyber, Kurram, and Orakzai, the Safed Koh range is located while in the two southern agencies of Waziristan, the Sulaiman range along with Waziristan hills are located. A large variety of minerals and gemstones are found in these mountains: emerald and tourmaline are found in the north, and garnet and quartz are found in the Bajaur and South Waziristan agencies. Department of Minerals is the government department working for the exploration and development of the mining industry in the region. According to their report, 29759 tons of quartz was produced in Mohmand agency in 2003–2004. However, the gemstone sector in the region is not developed and many resources have not been properly identified and exploited.

Region	Image	Gemstones	Notes	Ref
Mohmand Agency		Emerald, clinozoisite, sphene, and epidote	The image shows a light olive green coloured sphene (titanite) with epidote on calcite matrix.	
Bajaur Agency		Emerald, garnet, and scapolite	The image shows garnet and muscovite on mica matrix.	
Khyber Agency		Quartz, xenotime, and bastnaesite	Quartz found in the region include astrophyllite and reibeckite fibers. The image shows a bastnaesite crystal with reddish hue from Mulla Ghori in Khyber agency.	
Waziristan		Quartz	Various types of quartz include faden quartz, diamond quartz, phantom quartz, quartz with chlorite, and window quartz. The image shows a muddy brown coloured specimen of window quartz from South Waziristan.	

=== Gilgit Baltistan ===
The three mountain ranges of Gilgit-Baltistan; Himalayas, Hindukush, and Karakoram contain many minerals and gems including emerald, ruby, sapphire, aquamarine, moonstone, and amethyst. A number of other minerals are also found in the region such as peridot, tourmaline, topaz, garnet, red spinal, pargasite, diopside, sphene, apatite, azurite, rose quartz, and agate. In Swat, pale green to green coloured emeralds can be found in talc-carbonate schist. In Hunza, well formed pink to red crystals of ruby are found, while in Neelum valley high quality rubies also occur.

Region	Image	Gemstones	Notes	Ref
Chilas		Alluvial diopside, zircon, rutile quartz, aquamarine, and tourmaline	The image shows a pyramidal reddish-orange zircon crystal from Chilas.	
Gilgit and Shigar		Aquamarine, topaz, emerald, ruby, pollucite, rutile quartz, morganite, apatite, spinel, and pargasite	Golden and white topaz are found in the region. The image shows rare pink apatite with albite from Nagar Valley.	
Bulachi, Shengus, Stak Nala, and Tormiq Nala		Aquamarine, topaz, tourmaline, apatite, sphene, morganite, and quartz	Image shows deep purple apatite from Shengus.	
Shigar Proper		Apatite, zoisite, rutile quartz, epidote, and morganite	The image shows pastel-pink apatite with quartz from Shigar.	
Childee, Kashmal, and Yuno (Shigar valley)		Aquamarine, emerald-coloured tourmaline, apatite, morganite, topaz, and quartz	The image shows aquamarine cluster from the area.	
Testun, Dassu, Net Tahirabad, and Goyungo		Topaz, aquamarine, tourmaline, morganite, apatite, quartz, and emerald	Golden coloured Topaz of high quality is found here. Rare earth minerals are also found.	
Appu Aligund, Fuljo, Braldu, Bashu, and Karma		Tourmaline, aquamarine, garnets, diopside, ruby, pargasite, emerald, topaz, amethyst, scheelite, and quartz	Image shows aquamarine with schorl from Braldu valley.	
Khaplu, Ghanche District		Aquamarine, amethyst, and quartz	Fine quality golden rutile quartz is found here. Image shows rare specimen of quartz with calcite and actinolite.	

District Nagar Aquamarine Quartz, Topaz, Garnet and many more

=== Balochistan ===
Balochistan is the largest province of Pakistan by area and is covered by rough terrain and rugged mountain ranges. Major mountain ranges of the province include Makran, Sulaiman, Toba Kakar, and Kirthar. The main gemstones that are traded in the region include emerald, apatite, sapphire, agate, tourmaline, ruby, topaz, turquoise, lapis lazuli, quartz, garnet, and peridot.

Region	Image	Gemstones	Notes	Ref
Kharan District		Brookite, anatase, and quartz	The image shows striated anatase crystals (in black), brookite blade and quartz crystals covering a feldspar matrix from Kharan.	
Chaman		Quartz	Various types of quartz found are diamond, window, quartz on prehnite, and faden. Image shows translucent light sea-foam green prehnite with quartz crystals.	
Taftan		Quartz and brookite	The image shows a large specimen of quartz crystals on brookite from Taftan.	
Chagai		Malachite, azurite, garnet, zircon, obsidian, lapis lazuli, and brookite	The image shows fine quality brookite on quartz.	
Panjgur		Auriferous quartz	The image shows quartz crystals with epidote.	
Kalat		Brown garnet and fluorite		
Qilla Abdullah		Aragonite		
Loralai		Amethyst		

== See also ==
- List of minerals of Pakistan
- Pakistani craft
