= Makerwal =

Coordinates: 32°51′26.8″N 71°11′21″E

Makerwal مکڑوال
- Village
- Interactive map of Makerwal
- Country: Pakistan
- Province: Punjab
- District: Mianwali
- Time zone: UTC+5 (PST)

Makerwal (مکڑوال) is a village in Mianwali District in the Punjab province of Pakistan.

Makerwal is located in Isakhel tehsil at 32°51'26.8N 71°11'21E. Makerwal has various natural resources and minerals such as coal, silica, sand and iron ore. The main source of income is coal, transport. Mine Survey Institute of Makerwal is well known institute of Pakistan. Makerwal and Sultan khel surveyors are famous in Pakistan and overseas.
