= Ralli quilt =

Sindhi quilts

Ralli, Rilli or Rillki quilts are traditional hand-woven embroidered quilts from Southeast Pakistan. Originally produced in Sindh, in southeastern Pakistan, and the surrounding regions bordered by the southeastern part of Balochistan, the Bahawalpur region of Punjab, Rajasthan and the Kutch region of Gujarat. Traditionally, they were made of cotton, but synthetic fabrics have increasingly been used since the late 1900s. The types, colors, and designs of ralli quilts vary by region. There are different types of ralli making, three of which are widely known. These include appliqué, patchwork, and embroidered ralli. All rallis are handmade by women artisans of Sindh's remote areas. Embroidery designs and motifs are perceived on painted pottery from the area's ancient civilizations. Mothers used to explain several inheritance patterns to their daughters.

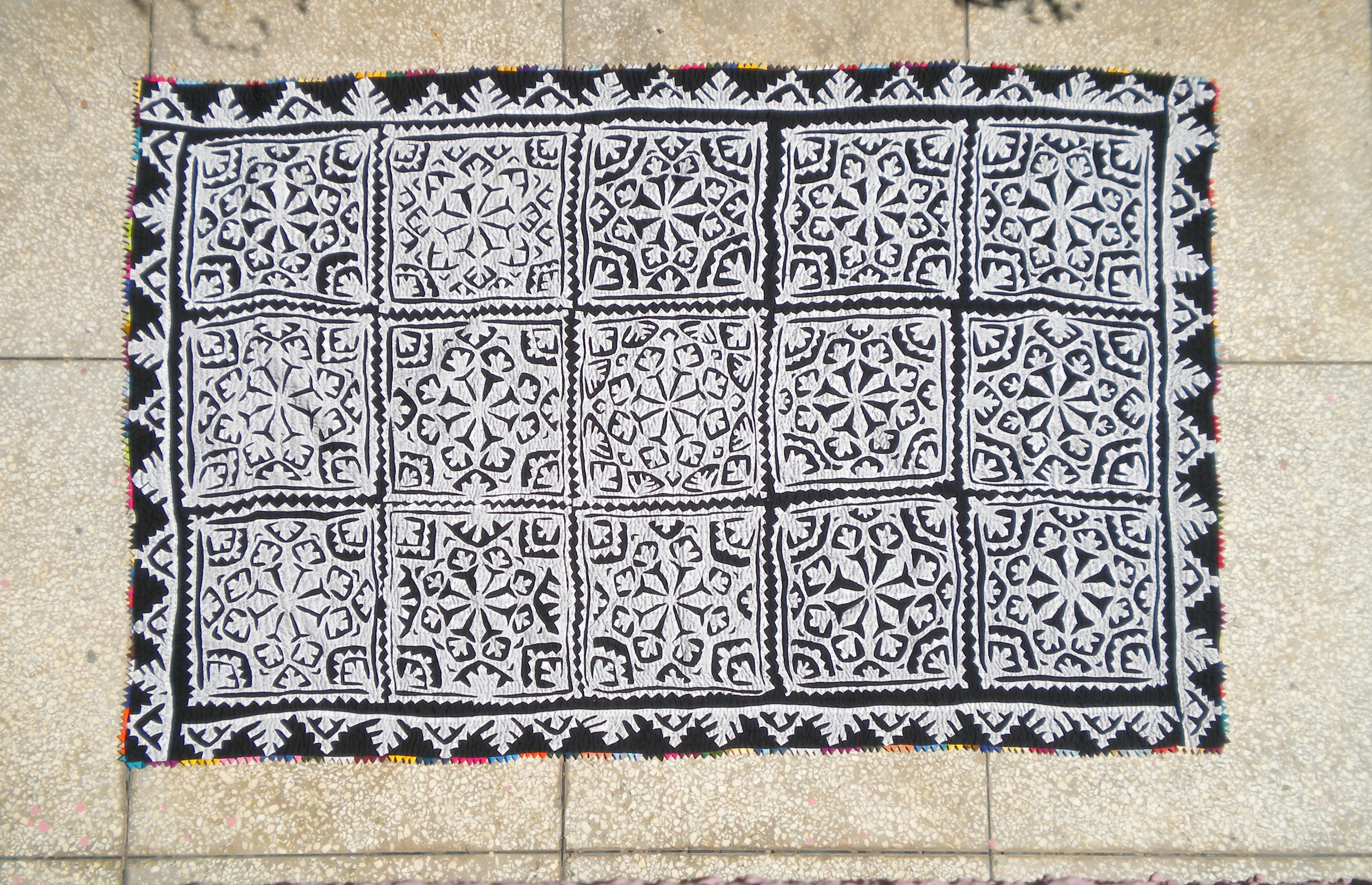
Tuk (applique) wari Ralli of Sindh

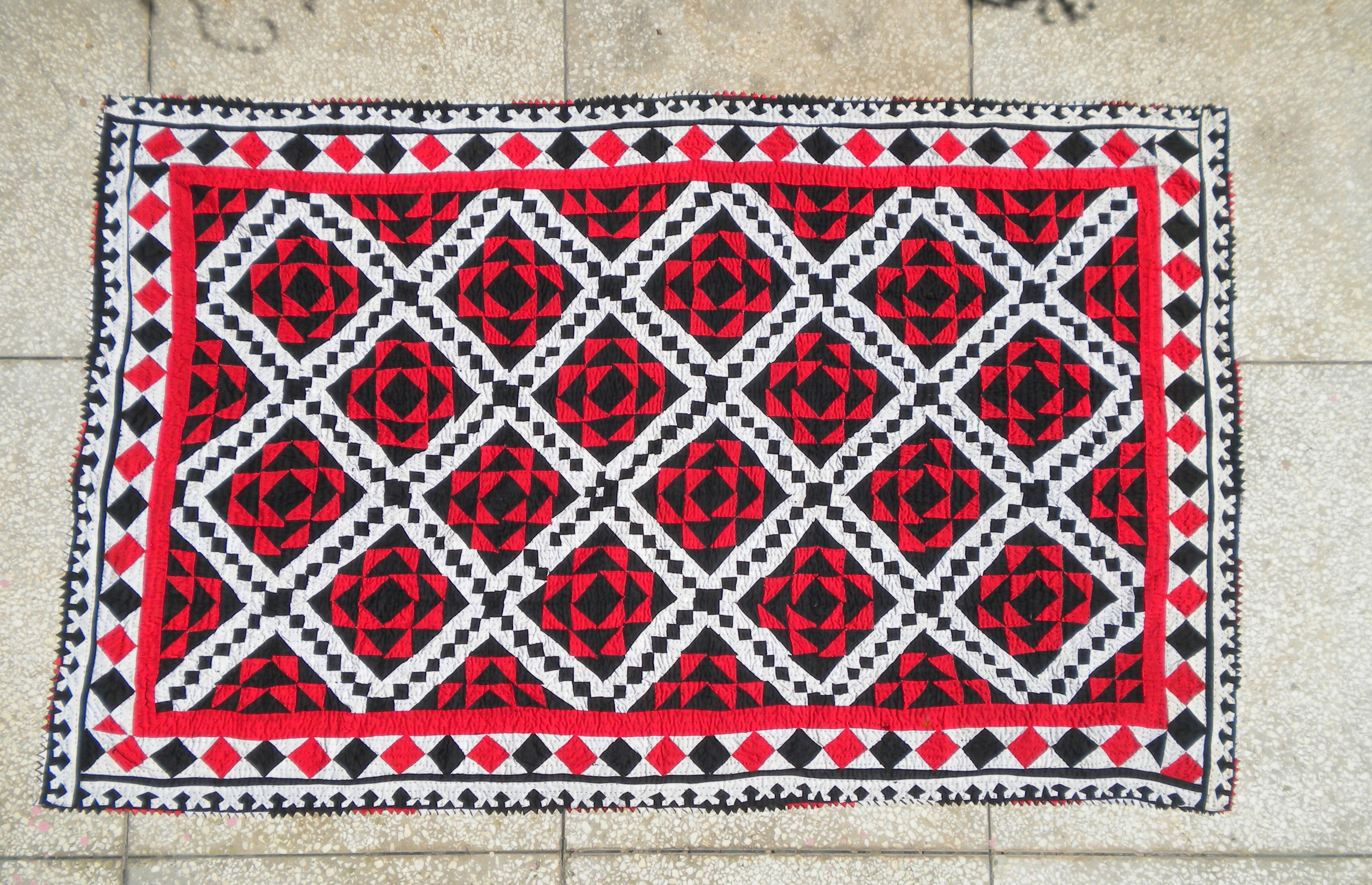
Tukrin wari Ralli Patchwork Ralli.

== Gallery ==
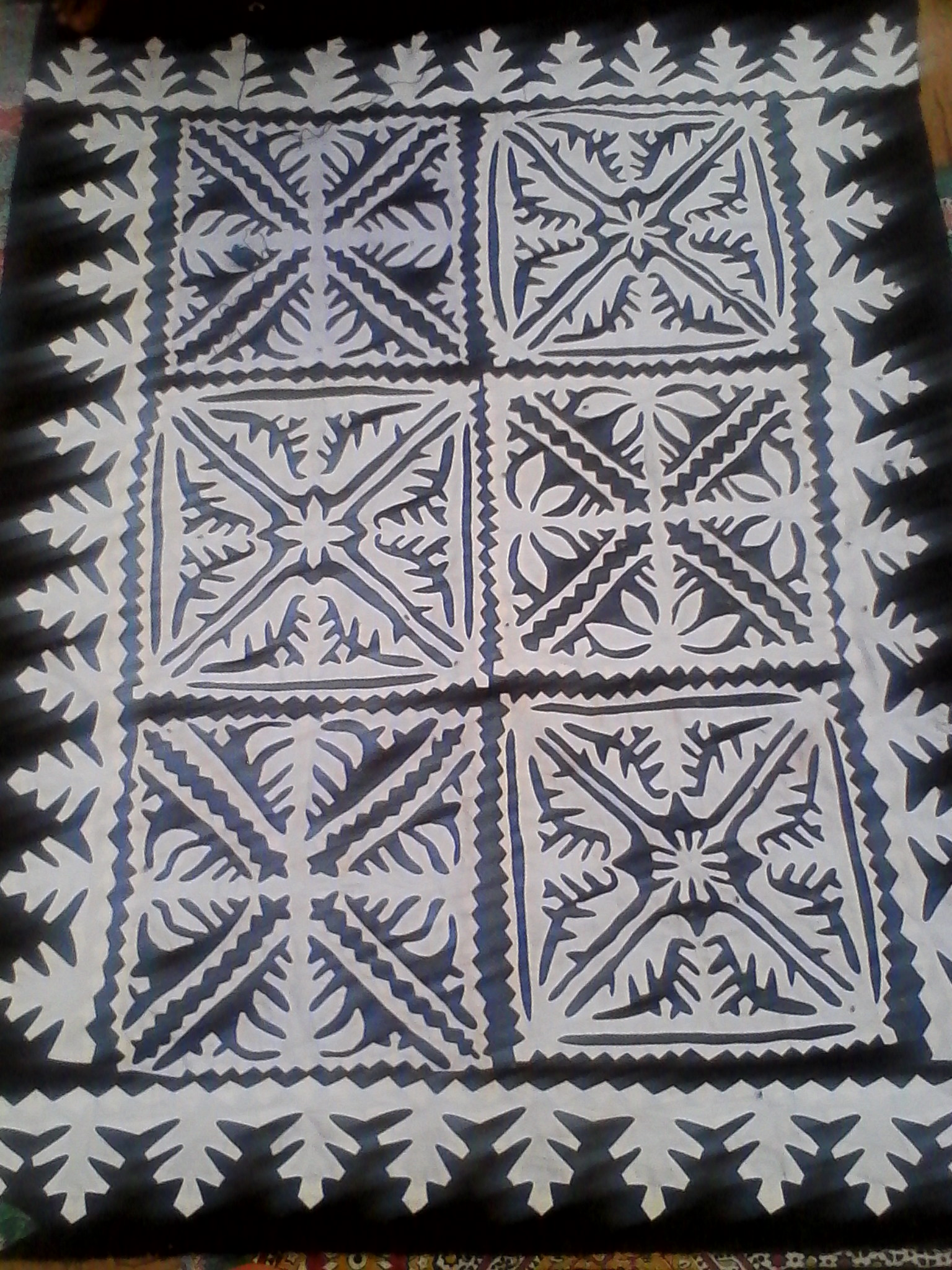

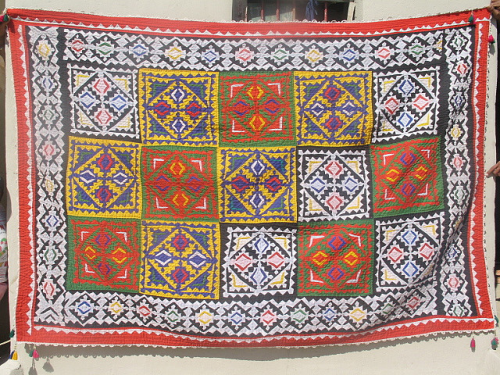

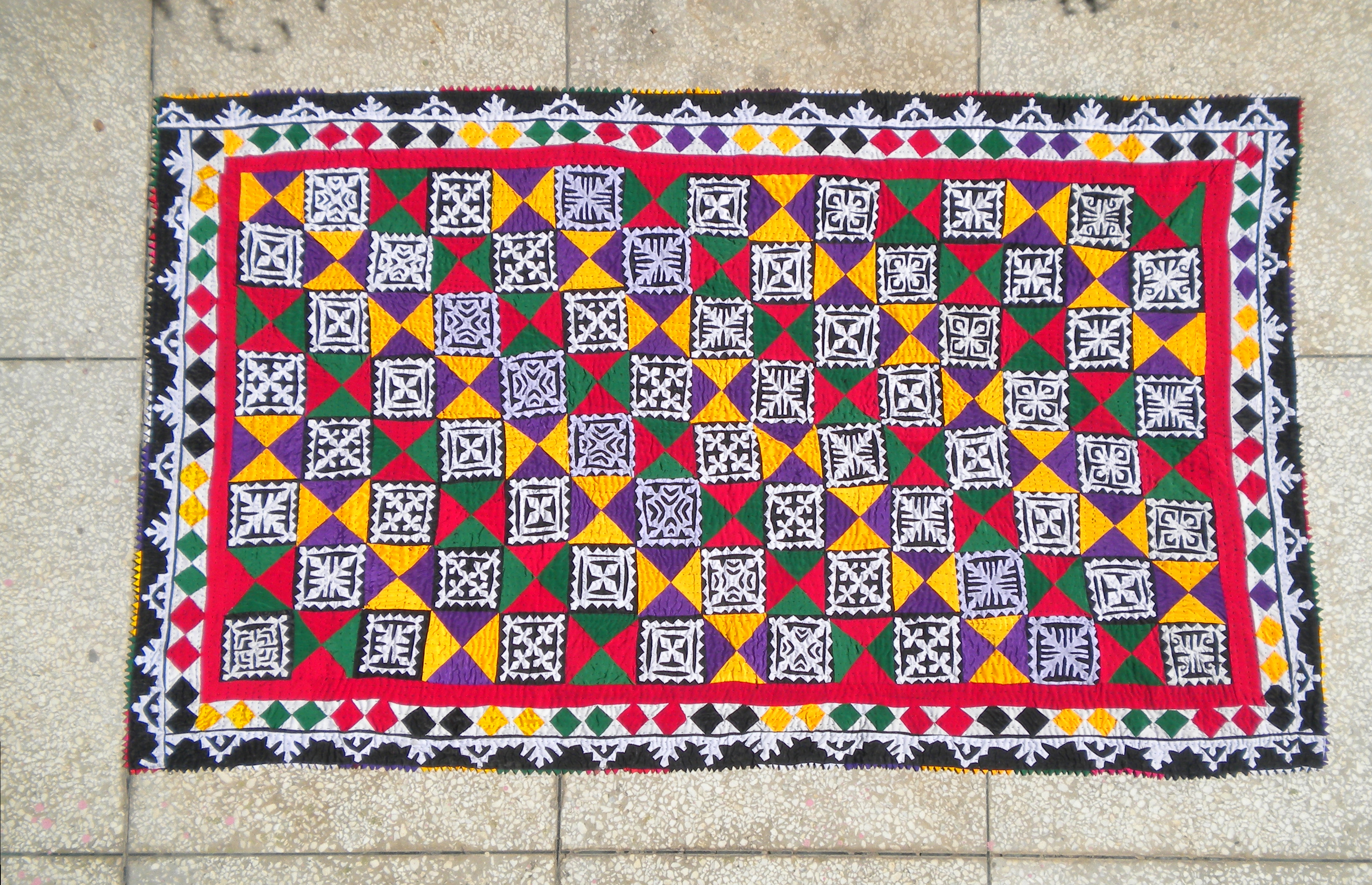

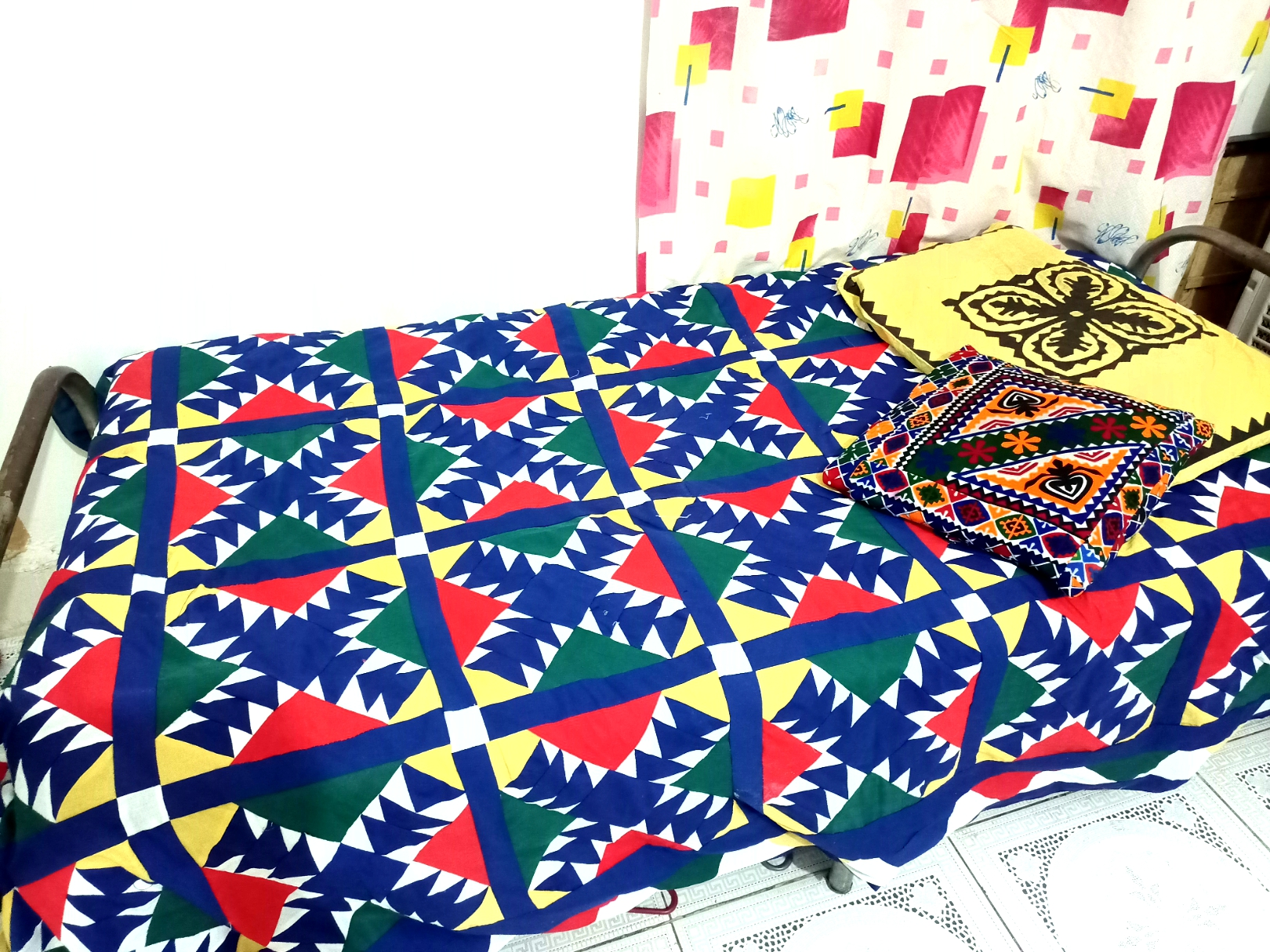

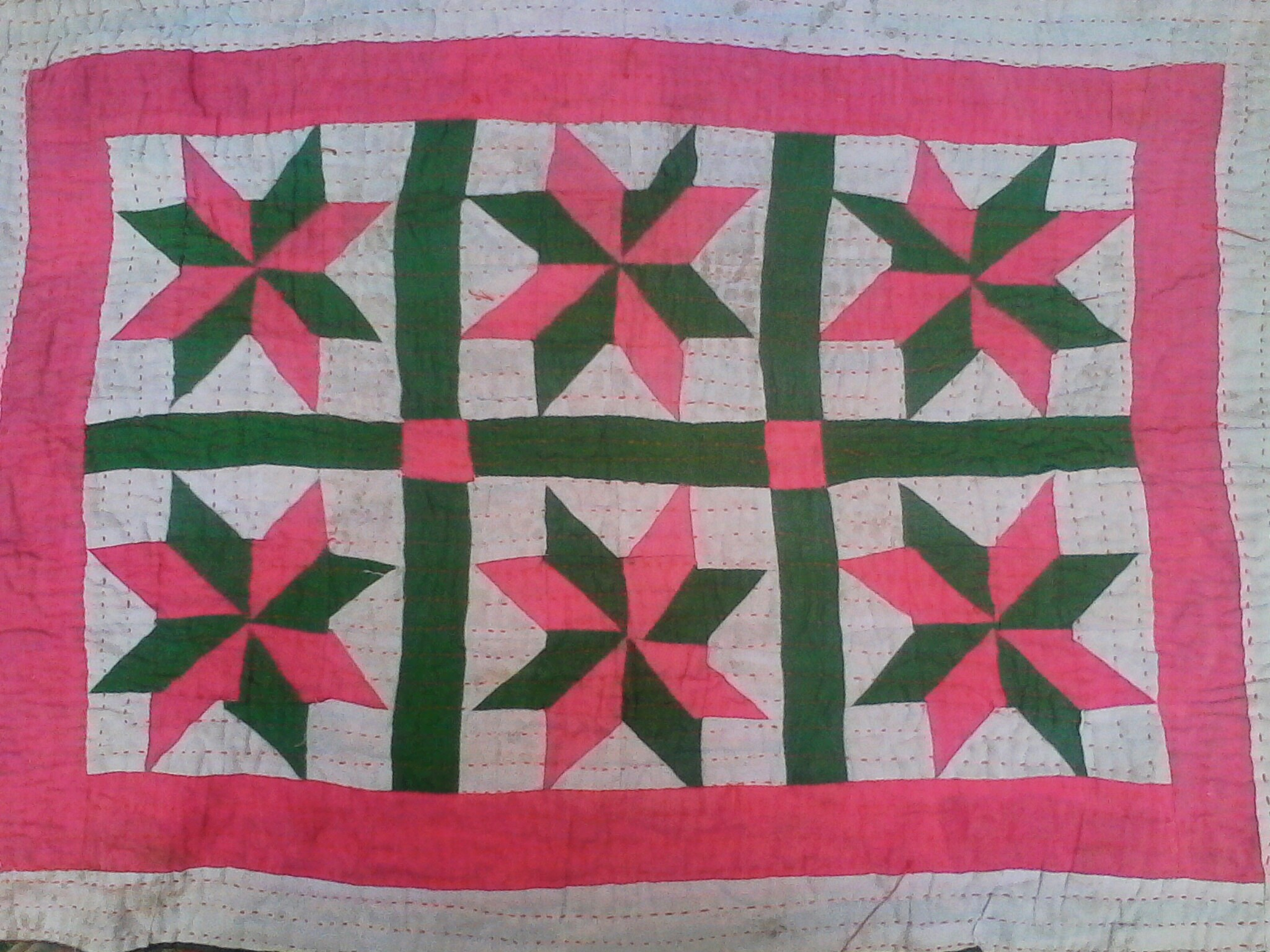

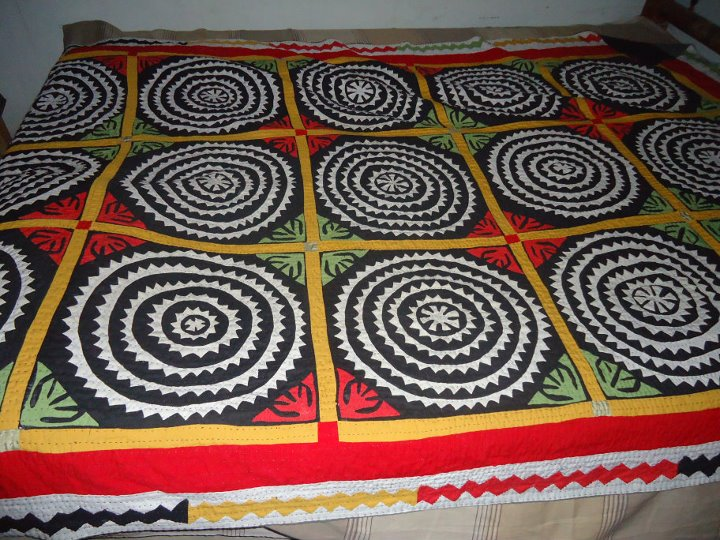

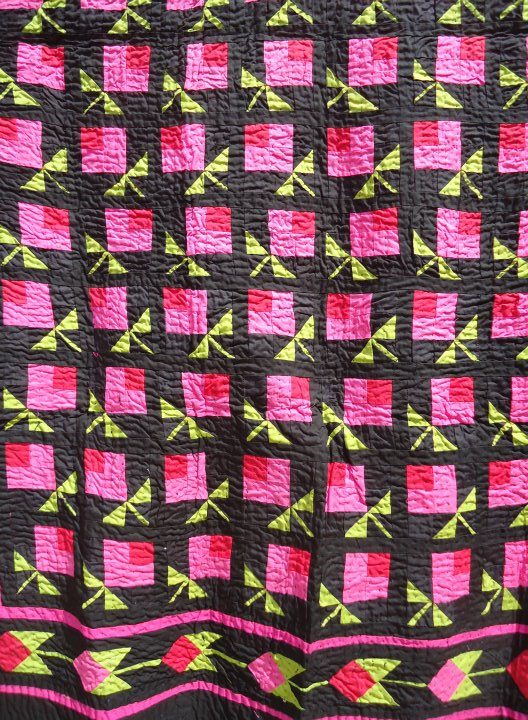
