= Dam failure =

Catastrophic failure of dam barrier by uncontrolled release of water

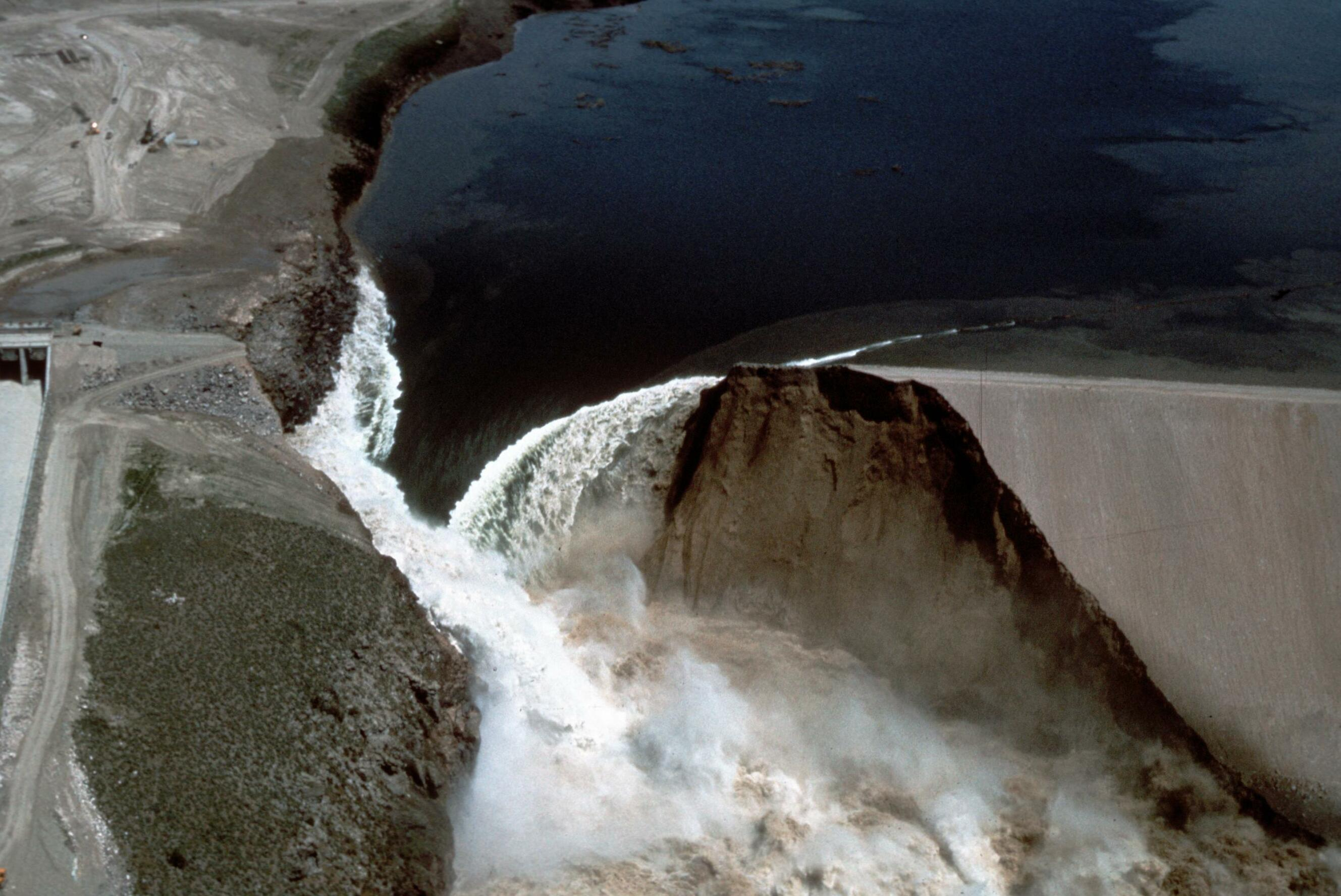
The reservoir emptying through the failed Teton Dam on June 5, 1976

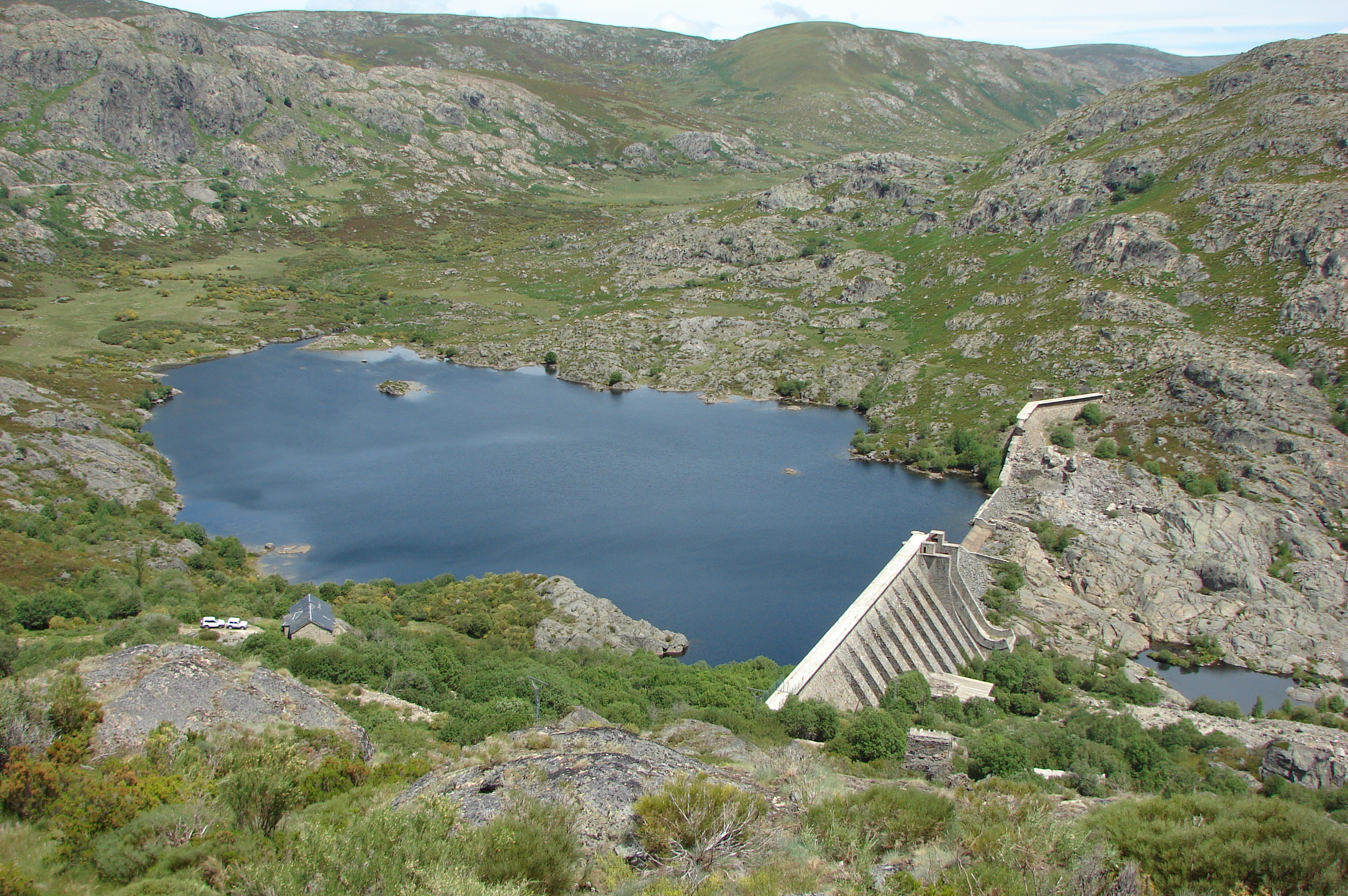
Ruins of the dam of Vega de Tera (Spain) after breaking in 1959

A dam failure or dam burst is a catastrophic type of structural failure characterized by the sudden, rapid, and uncontrolled release of impounded water or the likelihood of such an uncontrolled release. Between the years 2000 and 2009 more than 200 notable dam failures happened worldwide.

A dam is a barrier across flowing water that obstructs, that directs or slows down the flow, often creating a reservoir, lake or impoundments. Most dams have a section called a spillway or weir over or through which water flows, either intermittently or continuously, and some have hydroelectric power generation systems installed.

Dams are considered "installations containing dangerous forces" under international humanitarian law due to the massive impact of a possible destruction on the civilian population and the environment. Dam failures are comparatively rare, but can cause immense damage and loss of life when they occur. In 1975 the failure of the Banqiao Reservoir Dam and other dams in Henan Province, China, caused more casualties than any other dam failure in history. The disaster killed an estimated 171,000 people and 11 million people lost their homes.

== Main causes of dam failures ==
International special sign for works and installations containing dangerous forces

Common causes of dam failure include:

- Sub-standard construction materials/techniques (Gleno Dam)
- Spillway design error (near failure of Glen Canyon Dam, Oroville Dam, Walnut Grove Dam)
- Lowering of dam crest height, which reduces spillway flow (South Fork Dam)
- Geological instability caused by changes to water levels during filling or poor surveying (Malpasset Dam).
- Sliding of a mountain into the reservoir (Vajont Dam – not a dam failure, but caused nearly the entire volume of the reservoir to be displaced and overtop the dam)
- Poor maintenance, especially of outlet pipes (Lawn Lake Dam, Val di Stava dam collapse)
- Extreme inflow (Shadikor Dam)
- Human, computer or design error (Buffalo Creek Flood, Dale Dike Reservoir, Taum Sauk pumped storage plant)
- Internal erosion or piping, especially in earthen dams (Teton Dam)
- Earthquakes
- Climate-driven landscape instability (Rock-ice avalanches, Permafrost landslides, Debris flows, Outburst floods from glacial lakes and landslide-dammed lakes)

=== Deliberate breaching ===
A notable case of deliberate dam breaching was the British Royal Air Force Dambusters raid on Germany in World War II (codenamed "Operation Chastise"), in which six German dams were selected to be breached in order to impact German infrastructure and manufacturing and power capabilities deriving from the Ruhr and Eder rivers. This raid later became the basis for several films.

Attacks on dams were subsequently restricted by Article 56 of the 1977 Protocol I amendment to the Geneva Conventions. Dams may not be lawfully attacked "if such attack may cause the release of dangerous forces from the works or installations and consequent severe losses among the civilian population", unless "it is used for other than its normal function and in regular, significant and direct support of military operations and if such attack is the only feasible way to terminate such support". Similar provisions apply to other sources of "dangerous forces", such as nuclear power plants.

Other cases include the Chinese bombing of multiple dams during Typhoon Nina (1975) in an attempt to drain them before their reservoirs overflowed. The typhoon produced what is now considered a 1-in-2,000-year flood, which few if any of these dams were designed to survive.

The Kakhovka Dam was destroyed in June 2023, during the Russian invasion of Ukraine.

== List of major dam failures ==
Dam/incident	Date	Location	Country	Fatalities	Details
Marib Dam	575	Sheba	Yemen	Unknown	Unknown causes, possibly neglect. The consequent failure of the irrigation system provoked the migration of up to 50,000 people from Yemen.
Subiaco Dam	1305	Subiaco	Italy	Unknown	Amateur attempt to lower the dam
Döda fallet/1796 Ragunda lake burst disaster	1796	Jämtland	Sweden	0	Natural dam of glacial till had canal dug through it for purposes of navigation. As the till was hard to dig, water was used to erode the channel. The canal led to the failure of the dam.
Puentes Dam	1802	Lorca	Spain	608	1,800 houses and 40,000 trees destroyed.
Hogs Back Dam	1829-04-03	Ottawa	Upper Canada	Unknown	Inexperience with cold weather engineering allowed for a small leak in wall to form on March 28 and the dam to slump on April 2. The following day, on April 3, the dam failed and washed away down the Rideau River. A new dam of a different design was built atop the foundation of the original later that same year.
Bilberry reservoir	1852-02-05	Holme Valley	United Kingdom	81	Failed in a heavy rain. Inquest found construction was culpably negligent.
Dale Dike Reservoir/Great Sheffield Flood	1864-03-11	South Yorkshire	United Kingdom	244	Defective design and construction. Small leak in wall grew until new dam failed. More than 600 houses were damaged or destroyed. Led to regulation.
Iruka Lake Dam	1868	Inuyama, Aichi Prefecture (then Owari Province)	Japan	941	Under the influence of heavy rain from late April, this soil dam collapsed on May 13. Water accumulated in Lake Iruka overflowed downstream, causing severe damage to Inuyama, Iwakura, Kasugai, Tsushima Yatomi, and to Komaki. Eight hundred and seven houses were destroyed, with another 11,709 flooded.
Mill River Dam	1874	Williamsburg, Massachusetts	United States	139	Lax regulations and cost cutting led to an insufficient design, which fell apart when the reservoir was full. Six hundred million gallons of water were released, wiping out 4 towns and making national headlines. This dam break led to increased regulation of dam construction.
South Fork Dam/Johnstown flood	1889-05-31	Johnstown, Pennsylvania	United States	2 208	Blamed on poor maintenance by owners, who lowered crest by a meter or more; court deemed it an "Act of God". Followed exceptionally heavy rainfall. Sixteen hundred homes were destroyed.
Walnut Grove Dam	1890	Wickenburg, Arizona	United States	100+	A drunkard's negligence, shoddy construction, and corporate mismanagement killed as many as 150 after a routine flood exceeded the dam's design capacity.
Gohna Lake dam	1894-08-25	Garhwal	British India	1	Failure of a landslide dam. Authorities had been able to evacuate the valley.
Austin Dam	1900-04-07	Austin, Texas	United States	8	In an extreme current, two 250-foot (76 m) sections of the dam slid about 20 m (66 ft) downstream intact. The town was left without electrical power for months.
Hauser Dam	1908-04-14	Helena, Montana	United States	0	Heavy flooding coupled with poor foundation quality. Workers managed to warn people downstream.
Broken Down Dam	1908-09-24	Fergus Falls, Minnesota	United States	0	Design flaw; dam built on water springs. Four downstream dams and bridge destroyed; a fourth dam was opened and saved. Mills, homes and farms flooded. No fatalities.
Austin Dam	1911-09-11	Austin, Pennsylvania	United States	78	Poor design, use of dynamite to remedy structural problems. Destroyed paper mill and much of the town of Austin. Replacement failed in 1942.
Desná Dam	1916	Desná	Austria-Hungary	65	Construction flaws caused the dam failure.
Lower Otay Dam	1916	San Diego County, California	United States	14	Over-topped from flooding following heavy rains. Locally, blame was placed on Charles Hatfield who had been contracted by the City of San Diego for his efforts in rainmaking. Court cases following the dam's failure resulted in neither liabilities being passed to Mr. Hatfield nor the original payment, as both of the court's decisions ruled the event 'an act of God'.
Sweetwater Dam	1916-01-27	San Diego County, California	United States	0	Over-topped from flooding; spillway inadequate, water rose over a meter higher than the dam and waterfalled over its surface. Dam had been raised after a similar earlier overtopping. Partial failure.
Lake Toxaway Dam	1916-08-13	Transylvania County, North Carolina	United States	0	Heavy rains and lack of water-level controls caused the dam to give way. Private lake destroyed, resort area failed. Dam was later rebuilt in the 1960s.
Tigra Dam	1917-08-19	Gwalior	British India	1 000	Failed due to water infiltrating through sandstone foundation. Possibly more fatalities.
Gleno Dam	1923-12-01	Province of Bergamo	Italy	356	Poor construction and design, inferior materials. Lasted 40 days.
Llyn Eigiau dam and Coedty reservoir	1925-11-02	Dolgarrog	United Kingdom	17	The outflow from Llyn Eigiau destroyed Coedty reservoir. Contractor blamed cost-cutting in construction. Twenty-five inches of rain had fallen in preceding 5 days.
St. Francis Dam	1928-03-12	Santa Clarita, California	United States	431+	Geological instability of east canyon wall. Possibly many more unreported casualties due to unknown, large numbers of undocumented migrant workers in farmland below.
Castlewood Dam	1933	Franktown, Colorado	United States	2	Bad design and maintenance, with proximate cause of heavy rain. Dam failed at 1 am on 3 August 1933, with dam waters just 15 miles from the City of Denver. Warnings to the city by 4 am allowed most people to move out of the way of the flood waters.
Granadillar Dam	1934	Canary Islands	Spain	8	Bad design and foundation
Secondary Dam of Sella Zerbino	1935	Molare	Italy	111	Geological unstable base combined with flood.
Horonai Dam	1941	Ōmu, Hokkaido	Japan	60	A torrential rain struck around Horonai River area. This is the dam collapse in the wake, and according to official confirmed, the lost houses reached to 32.
Dnieper Hydroelectric Station	1941	Zaporizhzhya	Soviet Union	20,000-100,000 or 3,000	Stalin's secret police sabotaged the Dnieper Hydroelectric Station to halt the Nazi advance into the Soviet Union.
Nant-y-Gro dam	1942	Elan Valley	United Kingdom	0	Destroyed deliberately with explosive charge during testing and preparation for Operation Chastise in World War II.
Edersee Dam	1943-05-17	Hesse	Germany	70	Destroyed by bombing during Operation Chastise in World War II. Widespread destruction.
Möhne Dam	1943-05-17	Ruhr	Germany	1 579	Destroyed by bombing during Operation Chastise in World War II. Eleven factories were destroyed, 114 seriously damaged.
Xuriguera Dam	1944	Barcelona	Spain	8	Heavy rain.
Heiwaike Dam	1951	Kameoka, Kyoto Prefecture	Japan	117	After heavy rain, the Heiwaike Dam collapsed, and water from the reservoir swallowed a downstream village. Eight houses ware damaged in Kameoka and the surrounding area.
Tangiwai disaster	1953-12-24	Whangaehu River	New Zealand	151	Failure of Mount Ruapehu's crater lake. Natural tephra dam failed.
Taisho Lake Dam	1953	Ide, Kyoto Prefecture	Japan	108	Under the influence of heavy rain, outburst with a Ninotani Lake Dam, shortly before Typhoon Tess.
Vega de Tera disaster	1959-01-09	Ribadelago	Spain	144	According to dam workers' testimonies, the grounds had serious structural deficiencies due to poor construction. On the night of January 9, a 150-meter-long portion of the containing wall collapsed, releasing nearly 8 million m^{3} of stored water.
Malpasset dam	1959-12-02	Côte d'Azur	France	423	Geological fault possibly enhanced by explosives work during construction; initial geo-study was not thorough. Two villages were destroyed.
Kurenivka mudslide	1961-03-13	Kiev	Soviet Union	145	Impoundment of the clay slurry reservoir (storing the waste of the local brick factories) failed after heavy rains, inundating the Kurenivka neighborhood with meters of mud. An unofficial modern report claims as high as 1,500 fatalities, while official reports state 145.
Panshet Dam	1961-07-12	Pune	India	1,000	Dam wall burst due to pressure of accumulated rain water. To protect the earthen dam from the flow of water, concrete blocks were used instead of steel-reinforced concrete due to a steel shortage.
Baldwin Hills Reservoir	1963-12-14	Los Angeles	United States	5	Subsidence caused by over-exploitation of local oil field. Two hundred and seventy-seven homes destroyed.
Vajont Dam	1963-10-09	Monte Toc	Italy	1 917	Strictly not a dam failure, since the dam structure did not collapse and is still standing. Filling the reservoir caused geological failure in valley wall, leading to 110 km/h landslide into the lake; water escaped in a wave over the top of dam. Valley had been incorrectly assessed as stable. Several villages completely wiped out.
Spaulding Pond Dam (Mohegan Park)	1963-03-06	Norwich	United States	6	More than $6 million estimated damages.
Swift Dam	1964-06-10	Montana	United States	28	Failed in heavy rains. Another nearby dam did likewise.
El Cobre New and Old Dam	1965-03-28	Valparaíso	Chile	350–400	Liquefaction during an earthquake released water and mining waste which traveled downstream and buried the town of El Cobre.
Mina Plakalnitsa	1966-05-01	Vratsa	Bulgaria	107	A tailings dam at Plakalnitsa copper mine near Vratsa failed. A total 450,000 m^{3} of mud and water inundated Vratsa and the nearby village of Zgorigrad, which suffered widespread damage. The official death toll is 107, but an unofficial estimate is around 500 killed.
Sempor Dam	1967-11-29	Central Java Province	Indonesia	138	Flash floods over-topped the dam during construction.
Certej dam failure	1971-10-30	Certej Mine	Romania	89	A tailings dam built too tall collapsed, flooding Certeju de Sus with toxic tailings.
Buffalo Creek Flood	1972-02-26	West Virginia	United States	125	Unstable loose constructed dam created by local coal mining company, collapsed in heavy rain. 1,121 injured, 507 houses destroyed, over 4,000 left homeless.
Canyon Lake Dam	1972-06-09	South Dakota	United States	238	Flooding, dam outlets clogged with debris. 3,057 injuries, over 1,335 homes and 5,000 automobiles destroyed.
Banqiao and Shimantan Dams	1975-08-08	Zhumadian	China	26,000–240,000	The dam failure was caused by extreme rainfall, beyond the planned design capability of the dam, dumped on China by Typhoon Nina. Eleven million people lost their homes. Dam was later rebuilt between 1986 and 1993.
Teton Dam	1976-06-05	Idaho	United States	11	Geological problems including unsuitable bedrock, seismic activity and caves. USGS, said prior to completion: "Since such a flood could be anticipated, we might consider a series of strategically placed motion-picture cameras to document the process". Water leakage eroded the earthen wall and lead to dam failure. Thirteen thousand head of cattle died.
Laurel Run Dam	1977-07-19	Johnstown	United States	40	Heavy rainfall and flooding that over-topped the dam. Six other dams failed the same day, killing five people.
Kelly Barnes Dam	1977-11-06	Georgia	United States	39	Unknown, possibly design error as dam was raised several times by owners to improve power generation.
Machchu-2 Dam	1979-08-11	Morbi	India	5 000	The actual observed flow following the intense rainfall reached 16307 m^{3} s, thrice what the dam was designed for, resulting in its collapse. The 762 metres (2,500 ft) of left and 365 metres (1,198 ft) of right embankment of dam were collapsed. Within 20 minutes the floods of 12 to 30 feet (3.7 to 9.1 m) height inundated the low-lying areas of Morbi industrial town located 5 km below the dam.
Wadi Qattara Dam	1979	Benghazi	Libya	0	Flooding beyond discharge and storage capacity damaged the main dam and destroyed the secondary dam in the scheme.
Lawn Lake Dam	1982-07-15	Rocky Mountain National Park	United States	3	Outlet pipe erosion; dam under-maintained due to location.
Tous Dam	1982-10-20	Valencia	Spain	8	Heavy flooding coupled with poor quality of the dam wall, lack of qualified staff and negligence of a warning of heavy rain in the area. On the next day, newspapers reported possibly 40 fatalities and 25 disappeared but in the coming days the count went down to 8 or 9. One year later, La Vanguardia spoke of 25.
Val di Stava dam	1985-07-19	Tesero	Italy	268	Poor maintenance and low margin for error in design; outlet pipes failed leading to pressure on dam.
Kantale Dam	1986-04-20	Kantale	Sri Lanka	180	Poor maintenance, leakage, and consequent failure. Destroyed over 1600 houses and 2,000 acres of paddy fields. The dam was 1,400 years old, and heavy modern vehicles were driven across it.
Upriver Dam	1986-05-20	Spokane	United States	0	Lightning struck power system, turbines shut down. Water rose behind dam while trying to restart. Backup power systems failed, could not raise spillway gates in time. Dam overtopped (rebuilt).
Belci dam failure	1991-07-29	Belci	Romania	25	The embankment dam, built between 1958 and 1962 for the Borzești Petrochemical Plant on the Tazlău river, collapsed after record rainfall firstly overtopped the structure, followed by its breach later onwards. As the event happened in the night, 250 houses were destroyed, killing 25 people in the process.
Peruća Dam detonation	1993-01-28	Split-Dalmatia County	Croatia	0	Not strictly a dam failure as there was a detonation of pre-positioned explosives by retreating Serb Forces.
Merriespruit tailings dam	1994-02-22	Free State	South Africa	17	Dam failed after a heavy thunderstorm. The dam was in an unacceptable condition prior to failure. Widespread devastation and environmental damage.
Meadow Pond Dam	1996-03-13	New Hampshire	United States	1	Design and construction deficiencies resulted in failure in heavy icing conditions.
Saguenay Flood	1996-07-19	Quebec	Canada	10	Problems started after two weeks of constant rain, which severely engorged soils, rivers and reservoirs. Post-flood enquiries discovered that the network of dikes and dams protecting the city was poorly maintained.
Opuha Dam	1997-02-06	Canterbury	New Zealand	0	Heavy rain during construction caused failure, dam was later completed.
Virgen Dam	1998	Matagalpa	Nicaragua	0	Heavy rains and flooding from Hurricane Mitch severely damaged the Mancotal and El Dorado Dams, over-topping their spillways and nearly destroying the dams. The Virgen Dam was destroyed but later rebuilt.
Doñana disaster	1998-04-25	Andalusia	Spain	0	Over-steepened dam failed by sliding on weak clay foundation, releasing 4–5 million m^{3} of acidic mine tailings into the River Agrio, a tributary of the River Guadiamar, which is the main water source for the Doñana National Park, a UNESCO World Heritage Site.
Shihgang Dam	1999-09-21	Taichung	Taiwan	0	Caused by damage sustained during the 1999 Jiji earthquake.
Martin County coal slurry spill	2000-10-11	Martin County, Kentucky	United States	0	Failure of a coal slurry impoundment. The water supply for over 27,000 residents was contaminated. The spill was 30 times larger than the Exxon Valdez oil spill and one of the worst environmental disasters ever in the southeastern United States
Vodní nádrž Soběnov	2002	Soběnov	Czechia	0	Extreme rainfall during the 2002 European floods.
Zeyzoun Dam	2002-06-04	Zeyzoun	Syria	22	2,000 individuals displaced and over 10,000 directly affected.
Silver Lake Dam	2003-05-14	Michigan	United States	0	Heavy rains caused earthen Fuse plug dam and bank to wash away. Eighteen hundred people evacuated. Flood caused the failure of the downstream Tourist Park Dam.
Hope Mills Dam	2003-05-26	North Carolina	United States	0	In heavy rains, floodgate held shut bay-water pressure. Sixteen hundred people evacuated.
Ringdijk Groot-Mijdrecht	2003-08-23	Wilnis	Netherlands	0	Strictly not a dam or dike failure. The original peat soil surrounding a polder (where peat had subsided due to oxidization) was pushed away by the water in the canal. The peat became lighter than water during the 2003 drought. The real cause was new wooden piling along the canal. This new piling was water-tight and therefore the peat soil dried out. Around 1,500 residents had to be evacuated.
Big Bay Dam	2004-03-12	Mississippi	United States	0	A small hole in the dam grew, spouted higher, and eventually led to failure. One hundred and four buildings damaged or destroyed.
Camará Dam	2004-06-17	Paraíba	Brazil	3	Poor maintenance. Three thousand people homeless. A second failure happened 11 days after.
Shadikor Dam	2005-02-10	Pasni	Pakistan	70	Sudden and extreme flooding caused by abnormally severe rain.
Taum Sauk reservoir	2005-12-14	Lesterville, Missouri	United States	0	Computer/operator error; gauges intended to mark dam full were not respected; dam continued to fill. Minor leakages had also weakened the wall through piping. The dam of the lower reservoir withstood the onslaught of the flood.
Ka Loko Dam	2006-03-14	Kauaʻi, Hawaii	United States	7	Heavy rain and flooding. Several possible specific factors to include poor maintenance, lack of inspection and illegal modifications.
Campos Novos Dam	2006-06-20	Campos Novos	Brazil	0	Tunnel collapse.
Gusau Dam	2006-09-30	Gusau	Nigeria	40	Heavy flooding, lack of maintenance. Approximately 500 homes were destroyed, displacing 1,000 people.
Lake Delton	2008-06-09	Wisconsin	United States	0	Failure in June 2008 Midwest floods; nearby highway washed out, creating a new channel which drained the lake.
Koshi Barrage	2008-08-18	Koshi Zone	Nepal	250	Neglect of barrage and the building of barrage itself. The region however saw weak monsoon and multi-year drought preceding the barrage failure. The flood affected over 2.3 million people in the northern part of Bihar.
Kingston Fossil Plant coal fly ash slurry spill	2008-12-22	Roane County, Tennessee	United States	0	Failure of a fly ash slurry pond.
Algodões Dam	2009-05-27	Piauí	Brazil	7	Heavy rain. 80 people injured, 2000 homeless.
Situ Gintung Dam	2009-03-27	Tangerang	Indonesia	98	Poor maintenance and heavy monsoon rain.
Sayano-Shushenskaya Dam	2009-08-17	Sayanogorsk	Russia	75	Not a dam failure, but rather the power station accident where the turbine 2 broke apart violently due to the metal fatigue caused by overlooked vibrations, flooding the turbine hall and causing the ceiling to collapse. The dam itself was unaffected, and the power station rebuilt within 5 years.
Kyzyl-Agash Dam	2010-03-11	Qyzylaghash	Kazakhstan	43	Heavy rain and snowmelt. Causes, deathtoll disputed. Three hundred people were injured and over 1,000 evacuated from the village.
Hope Mills Dam	2010-06-16	North Carolina	United States	0	Sinkhole caused dam failure. Second failure of the dam, will be replaced.
Testalinda Dam	2010-06-13	Oliver, British Columbia	Canada	0	Heavy Rain, low maintenance. Destroyed at least 5 homes. Buried Highway 97.
Delhi Dam	2010-07-24	Iowa	United States	0	Heavy rain, flooding, malfunctioning spillway and structural problems. Around 8,000 people had to be evacuated. Replacement uncertain due to lake-dredging debt.
Niedow Dam	2010-08-07	Lower Silesian Voivodeship	Poland	1	Heavy rain, over-topped from flooding.
Ajka alumina plant accident	2010-10-04	Ajka	Hungary	10	Failure of concrete impound wall on alumina plant tailings dam. One million cubic meters of red mud contaminated a large area; within days the mud had reached the Danube.
Kenmare Resources tailings dam	2010-10-04	Topuito	Mozambique	1	Failure of tailings dam at titanium mine. Three hundred homes had been rebuilt.
Fujinuma Dam	2011-03-11	Sukagawa	Japan	8	Failed after 2011 Tōhoku earthquake. Authorities state that the dam failure was caused by the earthquake, making these the first earthquake-caused dam failure fatalities since 1930, worldwide. Nearby dams damaged by same earthquake.
Campos dos Goytacazes dam	2012-01-04	Campos dos Goytacazes	Brazil	0	Failed after a period of flooding. 4000 people displaced.
Ivanovo Dam	2012-02-06	Biser	Bulgaria	8	Failed after a period of heavy snowmelt. A crack in the dam went unrepaired for years. Eight people killed and several communities flooded.
Köprü Dam	2012-02-24	Adana Province	Turkey	10	A gate in the diversion tunnel broke after a period of heavy rain during the reservoir's first filing. The accident killed ten workers.
Dakrong 3 Dam	2012-10-07	Quảng Trị Province	Vietnam	0	Poor design aggravated by Typhoon Gaemi flood surge.
Tokwe Mukorsi Dam	2014-02-04	Masvingo Province	Zimbabwe	0	Downstream slope failure on a 90.3-meter-tall (296 ft) embankment dam, possibly as the reservoir was being filled. Residents evacuated upstream.
Mount Polley	2014-08-04	British Columbia	Canada	0	Tailings dam collapse due to negligent operation; reservoir was overfilled beyond design parameters despite repeated warnings of the danger combined with a minor dam breach a few months before and fundamental design flaws.
Mariana dam disaster	2015-11-05	Mariana, Minas Gerais	Brazil	19	Tailings dam collapsed. One village destroyed, 600 people evacuated. Sixty million m^{3} of iron waste slurry polluted Doce River, and the sea near the river's mouth.
Maple Lake	2017-10-05	Paw Paw, Michigan	United States	0	A heavy rainstorm caused a section of a dam to crumble because of the weight of a pond above, which happened around 5 a.m.
Patel Dam	2018-05-10	Solai	Kenya	47	Failed after several days of heavy rain. Private dam, causes unclear.
Panjshir Valley dam	2018-07-11	Panjshir Valley	Afghanistan	10	Dilapidated dam crumbled under heavy summer rains, 13 missing, 300 houses destroyed.
Xe-Pian Xe-Namnoy Dam	2018-07-23	Attapeu Province	Laos	71+	Saddle dam under construction collapsed during rainstorms. Six thousand six hundred people homeless, at least 71 killed, many missing. Company denied the dam had collapsed.
Swar Chaung Dam	2018-08-29	Yedashe	Myanmar	4+	Collapse of the dam's spillway. ~150,000 people displaced, 4 killed, 2 missing. Around 100 villages flooded.
Sanford Dam, Patricia Lake	2018-09-15	Boiling Spring Lakes, North Carolina	United States	0	Overtopping after over 36 inches of rainfall during landfall of Hurricane Florence.
Brumadinho dam disaster	2019-01-25	Brumadinho, Minas Gerais	Brazil	270	Tailings dam suffered a catastrophic failure releasing 12 million m^{3} of tailings slurry.
Spencer Dam	2019-03-14	Near Spencer, Nebraska	United States	1	Dam was breached after a major storm caused heavy rain.
Tiware Dam	2019-07-02	Ratnagiri District	India	23	Heavy rains overtopped and breached the dam.
Edenville Dam	2020-05-19	Edenville, Michigan	United States	0	Static liquefaction.
Sanford Dam	2020-05-19	Sanford, Michigan	United States	0	The failure of the Edenville Dam immediately upstream caused a large inflow into Sanford Lake, which overtopped the dam.
2021 Uttarakhand flood	2021-02-07	Chamoli, Uttarkhand	India	61	The Rishiganga dam was destroyed by either an avalanche or a glacier burst, leading to a large surge of water downstream that also breached the Tapovan Hydropower Plant. One hundred and forty-five people missing.
2022 Jagersfontein Dam Collapse	2022-09-11	Jagersfontein, Free State	South Africa	3	Structural failure.
Destruction of the Kakhovka Dam	2023-06-06	Nova Kakhovka, Kherson Oblast	Ukraine	58-350	Unknown, presumed intentional explosion.
Derna dam collapses	2023-09-11	Derna	Libya	5,900–20,000	Failure of two roughly 75- and 45-meter-tall dams following heavy rain from Storm Daniel against the backdrop of the Libyan civil war resulting in the city of Derna being inundated with approximately 30 million m^{3} of water.
Arbaat Dam collapse	2024-08-24	Port Sudan	Sudan	148	The collapse was triggered by severe rainfall and consequential flooding.
Liulan Reservoir Dam	2026-07-06	Guangxi	China	2 at this time	Heavy rainfall/Severe flooding from Typhoon Maysak caused water to breach the dam walls in two locations
Lake Inba	2026-09-22	Chiba Prefecture	Japan	2 (only disaster area)	According to Japan Meteological Agency official confirmed report, heavy rainfall and severe flooding from Typhoon Dujuan, and damaged levees breached in three locations, Narita, Sakura and Inzai, in Chiba Prefecture and each one of rice shortage facilities, goldfish and eel farm and some rice field were damaged.

== Expected dam failures ==
Based on the advances in structural engineering, seismology and previous dam failures, it has become possible to predict, or in some cases to know with certainty, about future dam failures. Important additional aspects are typical experiences with lack of monitoring and maintenance of dams and the false operation of dams in favour of electricity production, not flood-control (leading to higher reservoir levels with less flood intake-capacity). Some dam failures, like that of Aswan High Dam in Egypt, will be of such catastrophic consequences, that scientists and engineers have conducted studies, based on the method of flood routing to predict volume, speed and spreading of a flood following a dam failure. These studies are among the most significant warnings to governments, as inland floods, based on the high volumes of water from reservoirs, are the most destructive among all industrial disasters. A study about the Breach of Aswan Dam resulting in 209 cubic kilometers of flood waters was presented to the president and the advisory board on November 16, 2024, by Hany El-Kateb.

== See also ==
- Dam removal
- Grout curtain
- List of bridge failures
- List of hydroelectric power station failures
- Reservoir safety
- Structural integrity and failure
