= Gleno Dam =

Dam in Bergamo, Italy that failed in 1923

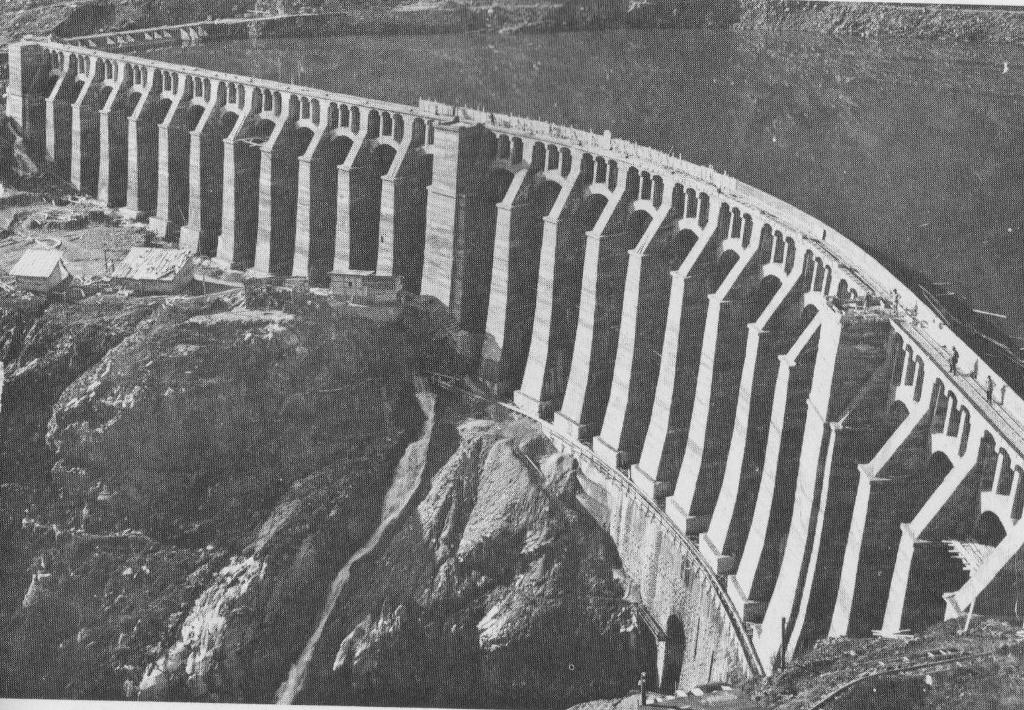
- The Gleno Dam in 1923, shortly before its partial collapse

- Location within Italy
- Official name: Diga del Gleno
- Country: Italy
- Location: Valle di Scalve, Province of Bergamo
- Coordinates: 46°00′59″N 10°04′30″E
- Status: Failed, surviving structure standing
- Construction began: 1916
- Opening date: 1923
- Demolition date: 1 December 1923

Dam and spillways
- Impounds: Gleno River
- Height: 43 m (141 ft)

Reservoir
- Creates: Gleno Reservoir
- Total capacity: 4,500,000 m^{3} (3,648 acre⋅ft)

Power Station
- Commission date: 1923
- Decommission date: 1923
- Installed capacity: 3,728 kW

The Gleno Dam was a multiple arch buttress dam on the Gleno Creek in the Valle di Scalve, northern Province of Bergamo, Italy. The dam was built between 1916 and 1923 with the purpose of producing hydroelectric power. The middle section of the dam collapsed on 1 December 1923, forty days after the reservoir was filled, causing widespread flooding that killed at least 356 people.

== Construction ==
The dam was proposed and constructed by the Viganò company. A request to construct it was submitted in 1907 and construction began in 1916. In 1920, construction began on the foundation. In September of that year, local officials were warned that contractors were not using proper cement mortar. In 1921, because of lack of funding, the project design was changed from a gravity dam to a multiple-arch type. The revised design was approved: the multiple arch dam would be constructed on top of the gravity dam foundation.

By January 1923, the dam was 80% complete and by October that same year, it was fully finished and its reservoir full after heavy rains. The dam's power plant had an installed capacity of 3,728 kW (3.7 MW).

== Failure ==
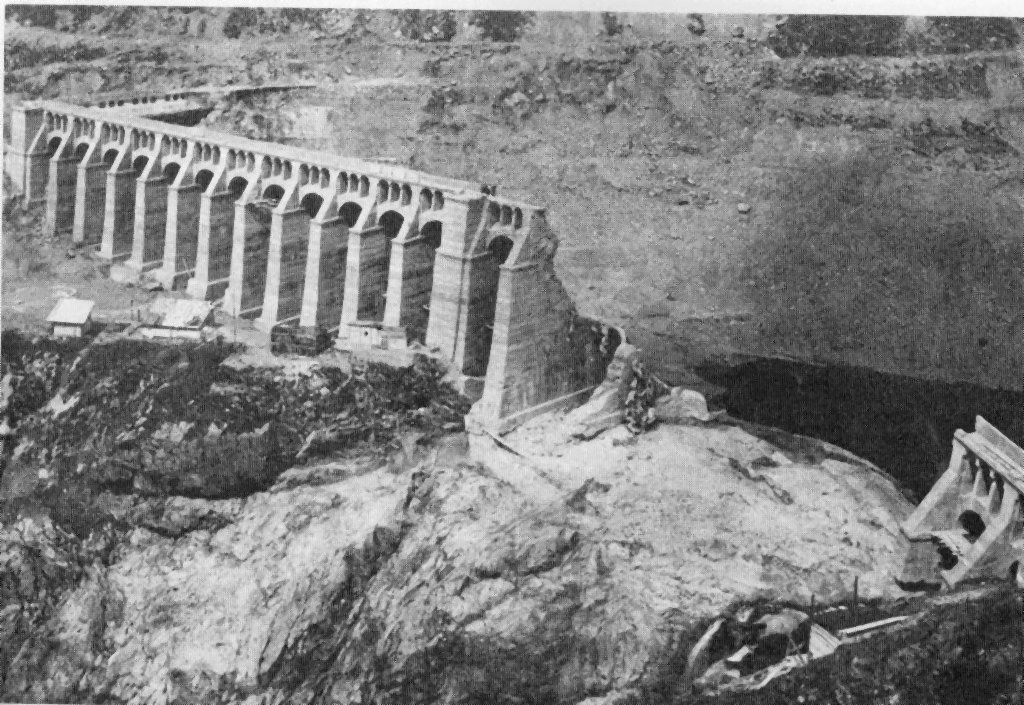
The dam after the failure, showing the collapsed section

At 6:30 a.m. on 1 December 1923, a buttress on the dam cracked and subsequently failed. Within minutes, an estimated 4,500,000 m^{3} (3,648 acre⋅ft) of water gushed from the reservoir at an elevation of 1,535 m (5,036 ft) to the valley below. The village of Bueggio was flooded first, followed by a partial flooding of Dezzo, part of the municipality of Azzone, and complete flooding of Dezzo, a frazione of Colere and Corna di Darfo. The flood waters stopped when they reached Lake Iseo, which lies at an elevation of 186 m (610 ft). At least 396 people were killed in the disaster.

== Investigation ==
The dam was originally permitted as a gravity dam with a slight curvature, but was changed to a multiple arch dam by the client to save money.

The permit was not revised for this change until after the dam was completed. The failure of the multiple arch dam was attributed to many aspects of its construction, ultimately poor workmanship. The concrete in the arches was of a poor quality and it was reinforced with anti-grenade scrap netting that had been used during World War I.

There were also indications that the dam was poorly joined with its foundation. Additionally, the concrete was believed not to be completely cured when the reservoir was filling. Reportedly, workers who complained about the construction techniques were fired.

== Legacy ==
The dam's failure was influential in the development of Italian dam design and risk assessment. As a result of the accident, multiple arch dams fell out of favour.

A much smaller dam was built spanning the gap left by the collapse, and is still in use today, creating a minor reservoir. A memorial at the site commemorates the tragedy.

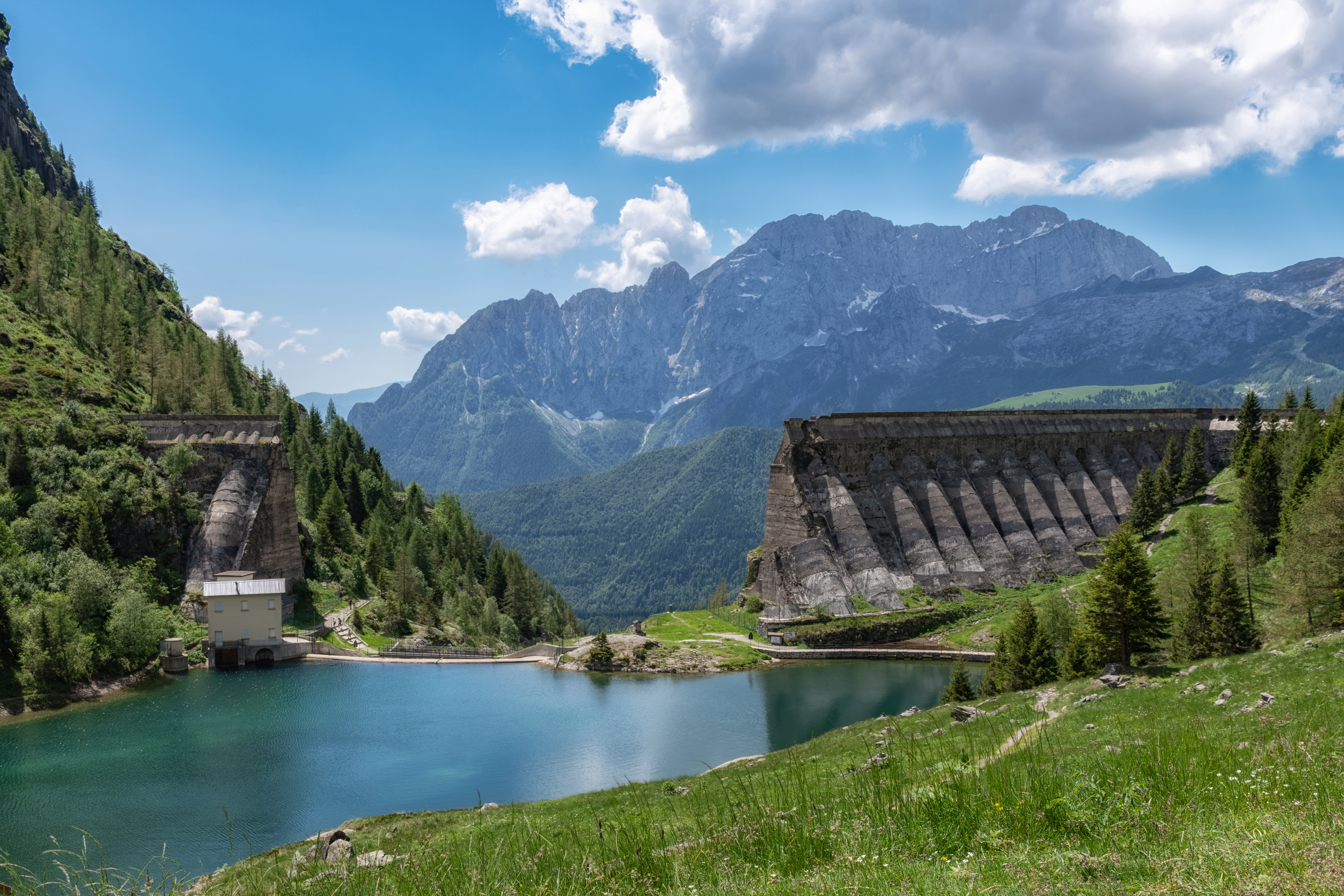
The ruins of the dam in 2019, with the new, smaller dam bridging the gap left by the collapse
