= Kyzyl-Agash Dam failure =

2010 disaster in Kazakhstan

Coordinates: 45°17′59″N 78°45′17″E

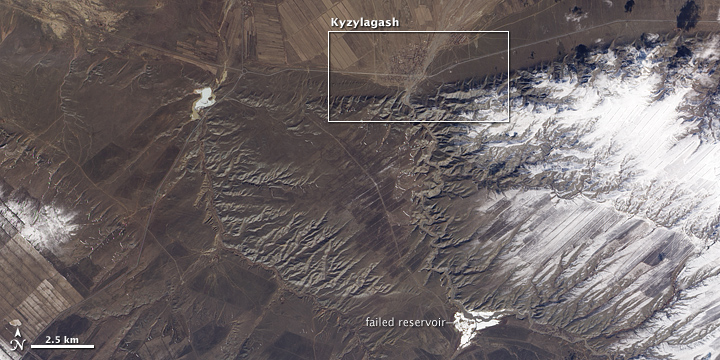
- Overhead of Kyzylagash after the flood.
- Date: March 2010
- Deaths: 43+

The Kyzyl-Agash Dam failure (Kazakh: Qyzylaǵash oqıǵasy), occurred in a dam located outside the village of Kyzyl-Agash, Jetisu Region, Kazakhstan. On 11 March 2010, the dam burst, flooding the village. At least 43 people were killed, 211 people were injured, and over 1000 evacuated from the village.

Opposition sources report a much higher figure for the death toll. An opposition newspaper Svoboda Slova reports that at least 200 have died, mostly children and old people, but an exact, official count is prohibited by the administration.

== Failure ==
A failure in the dam caused the reservoir to burst after torrential rain coupled with a sudden rise in temperature caused early snowmelt. The dam failure unleashed torrents of water about 2 metres (6.6 ft) high and washed away a bridge on a main highway connecting Almaty with the city of Ust-Kamenogorsk near the border with Russia.

More than 600 emergency service workers traveled to the region to clear the debris and to provide tents and much-needed aid for evacuees. Security in the area was stepped up to deter looters as well. A temporary camp, with a field hospital, was established to look after at least 1000 evacuees from Kyzyl-Agash and the Kazakh military dispatched units to the area to assist. Kazakhstan's Prime Minister, Karim Massimov, also traveled to the region to personally supervise the relief efforts.

President Nursultan Nazarbayev ordered an investigation into the incident, issuing a statement in which he said: "The general prosecutors or the interior ministry should open a criminal probe against the owner of the reservoir. It should be made responsible for the death of so many people". The Interior Ministry has said that Kazakh police detained several regional officials, including the mayor of Kyzyl-Agash. The government allocated 600 million tenge ($4.1 million) to provide compensation to people affected by the disaster and to deal with its effects.

The day before, another dam was washed away in the nearby Karatal District. The village Zhybulak was flooded, and many of the 820 residents of the flooded 140 homes had been evacuated into a nearby school.
