= Köprü Dam =

Dam in Kozan, Adana, Turkey

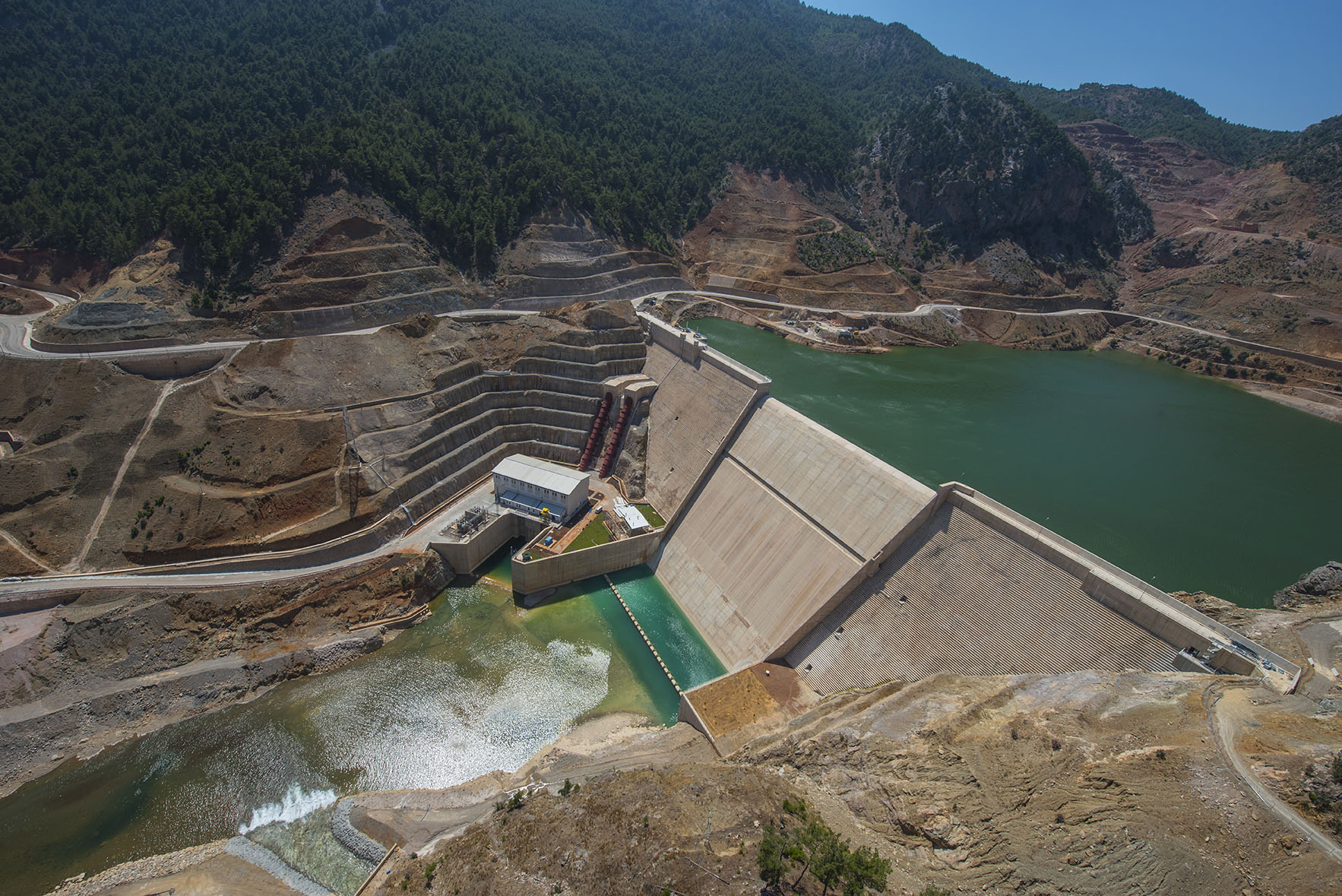

- Location within Turkey
- Official name: Köprü Barajı ve HES
- Country: Turkey
- Location: Kozan
- Coordinates: 37°37′12.72″N 35°36′49.07″E
- Status: Operational
- Construction began: 2009
- Opening date: 2012
- Owner: Enerjisa Power Generation Inc.

Dam and spillways
- Type of dam: Gravity, roller-compacted concrete (RCC)
- Impounds: Göksu
- Height: 109 m (358 ft)
- Elevation at crest: 415 m (1,362 ft)
- Dam volume: 1,215,000 m^{3} (1,589,160 cu yd)
- Spillway type: Uncontrolled overflow
- Spillway capacity: 5,223 m^{3}/s (184,449 cu ft/s)

Reservoir
- Total capacity: 93,200,000 m^{3} (75,558 acre⋅ft)
- Active capacity: 47,300,000 m^{3} (38,347 acre⋅ft)
- Inactive capacity: 45,900,000 m^{3} (37,212 acre⋅ft)
- Catchment area: 4,300 km^{2} (1,660 mi^{2})
- Surface area: 2.93 km^{2} (1 mi^{2})
- Normal elevation: 410 m (1,345 ft)

Power Station
- Commission date: 2012
- Hydraulic head: 92 m (302 ft) (gross)
- Turbines: 2 x 74 MW Francis-type
- Installed capacity: 148 MW
- Annual generation: 380 Gwh

The Köprü Dam is a gravity dam on the Göksu, the main tributary of the Seyhan River about 25 km (16 mi) northwest of Kozan in Adana Province, Turkey. Its primary purpose is hydroelectric power generation. Construction began in 2009 and was complete in 2012. On 24 February 2012, the dam's diversion tunnel seal broke while the dam was impounding the river for the first time. This resulted in 97,000,000 m^{3} (78,639 acre⋅ft) of water flooding the downstream area of the dam. The accident and subsequent flood killed 10 workers. Downstream communities received proper warning and no one was killed.

== See also ==
- Dam failure
- Kavşak Bendi Dam – downstream on the Sehyan River
- List of dams and reservoirs in Turkey
