= Camará Dam =

Dam in Paraíba, Brazil

Coordinates: 7.02185°S 35.7765°W

- Interactive map of Camará Dam
- Location: Paraíba, Brazil
- Construction began: 2000
- Opening date: 2002
- Construction cost: US$6.5 million

Dam and spillways
- Type of dam: masonry
- Impounds: Mamanguape River
- Height: 50 m (160 ft)

The Camará Dam was a dam located on the Mamanguape River in Paraíba, northeastern Brazil. It burst on June 17, 2004, flooding towns of Alagoa Grande and Mulungu. At least three people died by drowning.

== History ==
The preliminary study for the construction of the dam began with the geological survey of the site in 1997. After the contract was awarded, the contractor began clearing the foundation in 2000. The construction of the dam started in 2000 and was completed in 2002. On 17 June 2004, the dam burst. In 2011, the reconstruction progress began by calling for tender. The dam was rebuilt and completed in 2016.
