= Austin Dam failure (Texas) =

Dam in Austin, Texas which failed in 1900

Austin Dam
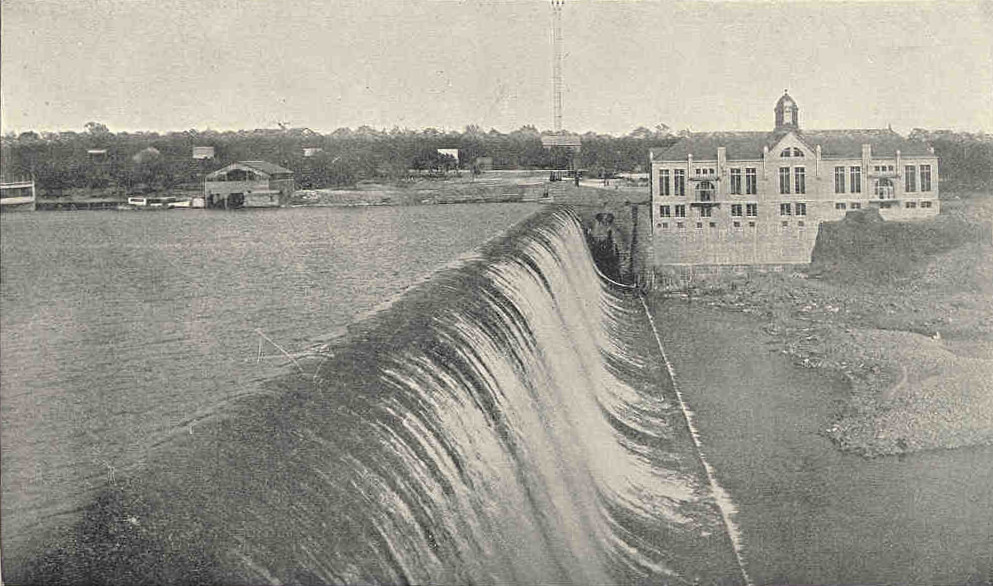
- Austin Dam and Power-House
- Interactive map of Austin Dam
- Country: United States
- Location: Travis County near Austin, Texas
- Coordinates: 30°17′40″N 97°47′11″W
- Purpose: Water supply and power generation
- Status: Destroyed
- Construction began: November 5, 1890; 135 years ago
- Demolition date: April 7, 1900; 126 years ago

Dam and spillways
- Impounds: Colorado River
- Height (thalweg): 60 feet (18 m)
- Length: 1,091 feet (333 m)
- Width (base): 66 feet (20 m)

Reservoir
- Creates: Lake McDonald

The Austin Dam failure, also referred to as "The Great Granite Dam" failure, was a catastrophic dam failure near Austin, Texas that killed several dozen people in 1900. The destruction of the dam drained the Lake McDonald reservoir and left the city of Austin without electrical power for a number of months.

"At 11.20 a.m. on April 7, when the lake level had reached a height of 11.07 feet above the crest of the dam, the dam gave way at a point ... about 300 feet from the east end of the dam. Observers [at three different points] all agree in their testimony that it first opened [at the point about 300 feet from the east end of the dam], and as though the mad current had simply pushed its way through the structure. Sooner than it takes to write these words the two sections ... each about 250 feet long, were shoved or pushed into the lower positions ... about 60 feet from their former positions in the dam. There was not the slightest overturning. ...

As soon as the sections were broken out ... the partially pent-up waters rushed through the gap, those held back by [the intact section] producing a strong current in the direction of the power house. This current struck the wall of the power house almost on a level with the floor of the pump room (about 12 feet below the crest of the dam), crushed in all of the windows on the west side, flooded all of the lower stories, and caught and drowned five employees and three small boys. Two of the employees miraculously escaped by climbing through a belt hole in the dynamo room. These workmen were pumping water from the lower portions of the power house."

Subsequent attempts to rebuild the dam were unsuccessful. The dam was finally replaced by the Tom Miller Dam in the 1940s.
