= Qyzylaghash =

- Location in Kazakhstan
- Coordinates: 45°22′21″N 78°43′16″E
- Country: Kazakhstan
- Region: Jetisu Region

Population (2009)
  - Total: 2,256
- Time zone: UTC+6 (Omsk Time)

Qyzylaghash (Kazakh: Қызылағаш, Qyzylağaş), sometimes spelled Kyzylagash, is a village in Jetisu Region of south-eastern Kazakhstan. In March 2010 at least 43 people died in Qyzylaghash as a result of a dam failure.
