= Taisho-ike Dam (Kyoto) =

Dam in Kyoto Prefecture, Japan

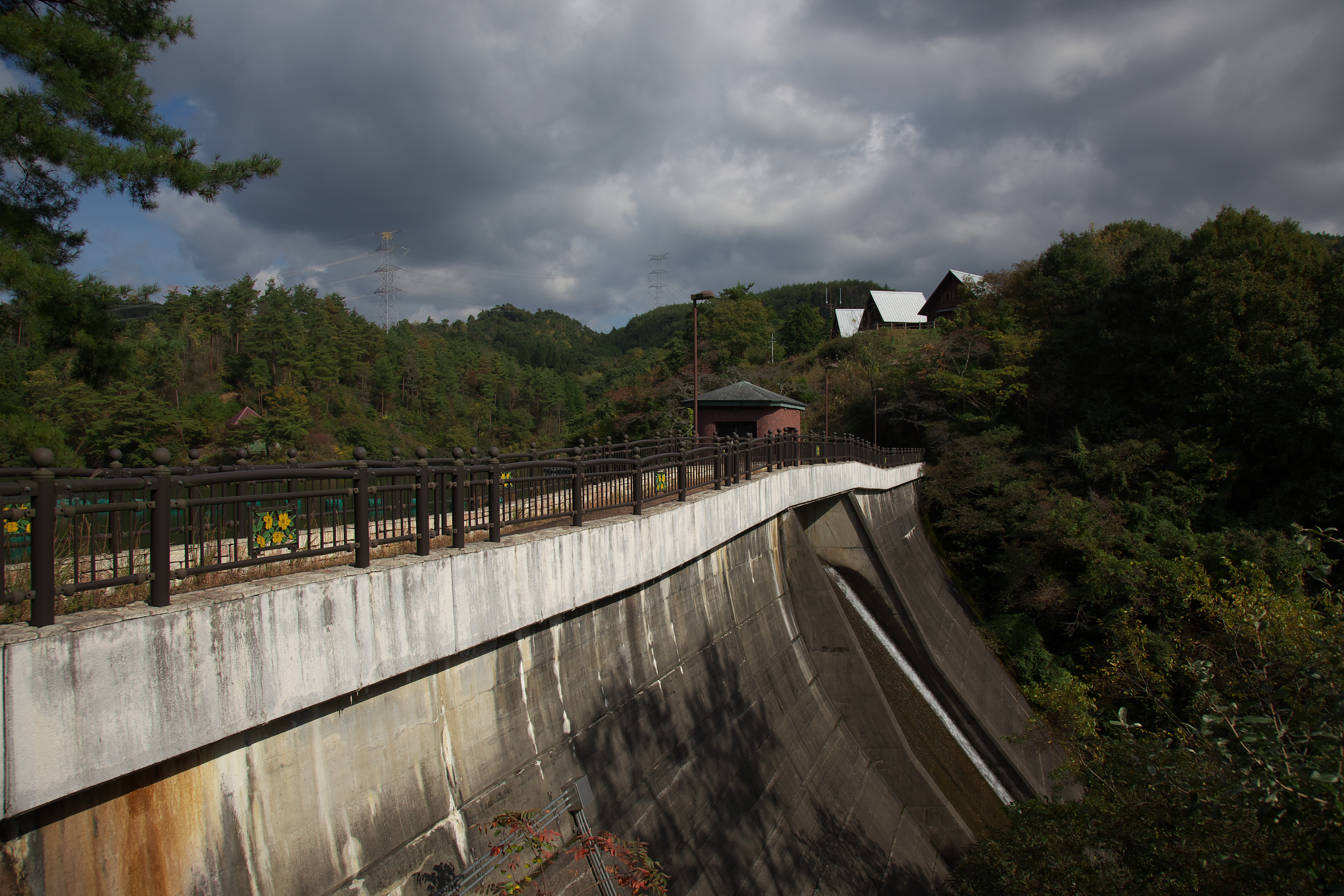

- Location within Japan
- Official name: 大正池（再）
- Location: Kyoto Prefecture, Japan
- Coordinates: 34°48′41″N 135°51′16″E
- Construction began: 1996
- Opening date: 1999

Dam and spillways
- Height: 26.5 m (87 ft)
- Length: 89 m (292 ft)

Reservoir
- Total capacity: 230,000 m^{3} (8,100,000 cu ft)
- Catchment area: 2.8 km^{2} (1.1 sq mi)
- Surface area: 4 hectares (9.9 acres)

Taisho-ike Dam (Japanese: 大正池（再）) is a gravity dam located in Kyoto Prefecture in Japan. The dam is used for irrigation. The catchment area of the dam is 2.8 km^{2}. The dam impounds about 4 ha of land when full and can store 230 thousand cubic meters of water. The construction of the dam was started on 1996 and completed in 1999.

The former Taisho Pond, which was the predecessor of the actual dam, collapsed due to flooding just before Typhoon Tess (known in Japan as Typhoon No. 13) in Showa 28 (1953). It struck the town of Ide downstream and caused extensive damage. The main cause of the breakdown of the dam is torrential rain, but experts have also pointed out inadequacies in the design and management of the dam.

== See also ==
- List of dams in Japan
