= Tiware dam failure =

Coordinates: 17.600043°N 73.694721°E

On 2 July 2019, the Tiware dam in Ratnagiri district of Maharashtra state of India failed following heavy rains. The failure resulted in flooding of the villages situated downstream. At least 19 people died, and four went missing.

== Dam failure ==
The dam was 79.8m (260ft) tall, 500m long with a carrying capacity of 20 lakh cubic metres water reservoir constructed around the year 2000. Around 9.30 p.m. on 2 July 2019, the Tiware dam, failed which was overflowing after incessant rains previous days. The water flooded at least seven villages situated downstream including Bhendewadi, Daadar, Akle, Riktoli, Ovali, Kalkavne and Nandivase with a population of about 3000. Several houses were washed away. At least 19 people died and four more went missing.

== Relief and rescue operations ==
The National Disaster Response Force and the fire brigade teams from Pune and Sindhudurg were deployed for rescue operation. The villagers were moved and the search operation for missing people was launched.

Chief Minister of Maharashtra state Devendra Fadnavis announced that ex gratia of ₹4 lakh (US$4,200) will be given to the next of kin of the deceased and later ordered an investigation by the Special Investigation Team (SIT). The State Water Resources Minister Girish Mahajan said that the villagers had complained of cracks in the dam and the district administration was informed in November 2018. There was an issue over jurisdiction under which the dam fell.
