= Wadi Qattara Dam =

- Location within Libya
- Country: Libya
- Location: Benghazi
- Coordinates: 32°01′36″N 20°24′18″E
- Status: Operational
- Construction began: 1968
- Opening date: 1971

Dam and spillways
- Impounds: Wadi Qattara
- Height: 55 m (180 ft)
- Length: 365 m (1,198 ft)
- Spillway capacity: Spillway: 92 m^{3}/s (3,249 cu ft/s); Outlet works: 148 m^{3}/s (5,227 cu ft/s); Total: 240 m^{3}/s (8,476 cu ft/s)

Reservoir
- Total capacity: 135,000,000 m^{3} (109,446 acre⋅ft)
- Catchment area: 1,224 km^{2} (473 sq mi)
- Surface area: 18 km^{2} (7 sq mi)

The Wadi Qattara Dam, also referred to as Gattara or Al-Qattarah, is a clay-fill embankment dam located on Wadi Al-Qattara, 33 km (21 mi) east of Benghazi in Libya. Together with a secondary dam located 10 km (6 mi) downstream at 31°59′43″N 20°20′04″E and seven drop structures, the scheme was constructed after floods damaged the Benghazi area in 1938 and 1954. They were also constructed for irrigation water supply. Construction of the dams began in 1968 and was completed in 1971. However, a flood in 1979 severely damaged the main dam and destroyed the secondary dam downstream. The main dam was rehabilitated and the secondary dam was replaced with a rock-fill dam between 2000 and 2004 at a cost of US$30 million. The main dam was heightened 7 m (23 ft) and its total discharge capacity was increased to 240 m^{3}/s (8,476 cu ft/s). Both dams were designed by Coyne et Bellier.

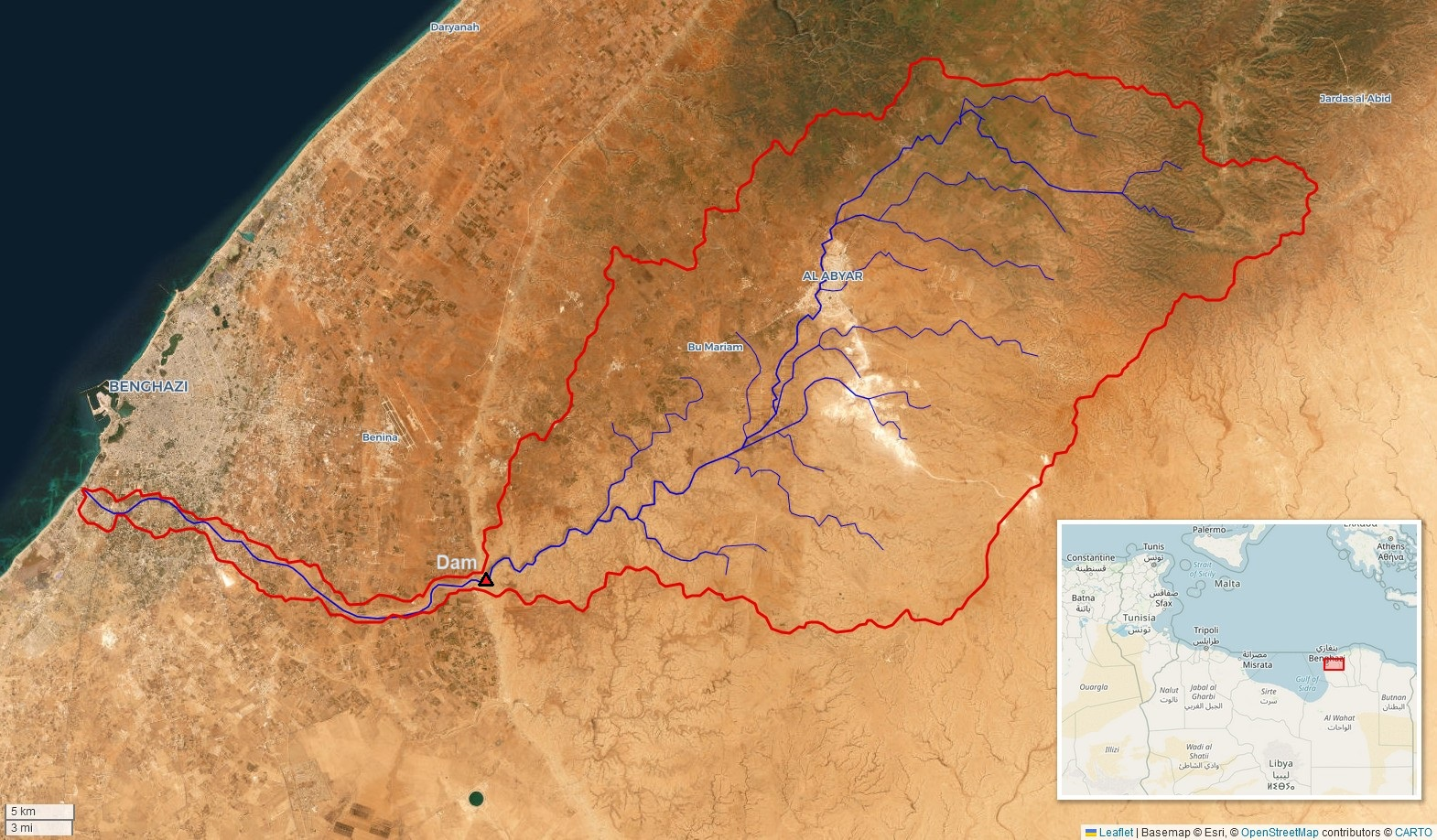
Wadi al Qattarah watershed (Interactive map)
