= Meadow Pond Dam =

Earthen dam in Alton, United States

Coordinates: 43°27′27″N 71°14′33″W

Meadow Pond Dam was an earthen dam in Alton, New Hampshire, in the United States, that collapsed in 1996, causing a fatal flood.

== Location ==
Alton is a town of 5,000 located at the southern tip of Lake Winnipesaukee in east-central New Hampshire. A single two-lane highway (Route 140) serves as the main gateway to the town from the west. Route 140 crosses the Merrymeeting River to the west of the center of town.

== Meadow Pond/Bergeron Pond dam failure ==
Located to the northwest of the river crossing reside the Bergerons, who own the 696-acre (282 ha) property where Meadow Pond is located. After purchasing the property in the early 1990s, the Bergerons constructed a dam at their own expense to expand the original pond for boating and other recreational uses. The pond was increased to 45 acres (18 ha) of water (92,000,000 US gallons (12,300,000 cu ft) of water), held back by a trapezoidal-shaped earthen dam, 465 feet (142 m) long and 36 feet (11 m) high.

On the evening of Wednesday, March 13, 1996, the wife of the dam owner noticed the creek running between the Bergeron dam and the Merrymeeting River swollen with water. Bob Bergeron inspected the dam at 6:46 p.m. and found that a three-foot hole had opened in the dam and was flooding the area between his residence and Route 140. Less than ten minutes later the dam had failed, releasing 92 million gallons of water towards town. The failure of the Bergeron Dam resulted in one fatality, two injuries, and damage to several homes.

The rush of water from the dam break undermined a section of Route 140, causing a tractor-trailer to sink into a hole in the road. Larry Sinclair, owner of the tractor trailer, was rescued by a neighbor, but his wife Lynda, 48, who was traveling behind him in a pickup truck, was killed when flood waters swept the truck into a ravine.

About a quarter-mile of road was damaged. The flooding also caused power outages in Gilmanton, Belmont, and Alton. Code Enforcement Officer Richard Canuel initially suggested, "There are a great many possible causes or combination of causes -- from something as simple as a leak in a dam pipe, to the natural effects of ice damming." Subsequent investigations by the state-appointed civil engineering firm GEI Consultants indicated the failure was caused by a combination of design and construction deficiencies. The design did not adequately account for the cold weather conditions, and mistakes in construction greatly exacerbated the errors.
