= Gohna Lake dam-burst =

The Gohna Lake dam-burst (or Durmi Lake dam-burst) was a flood in the Garhwal Region of India on 25/26 August 1894 caused by a landslide-induced temporary lake.

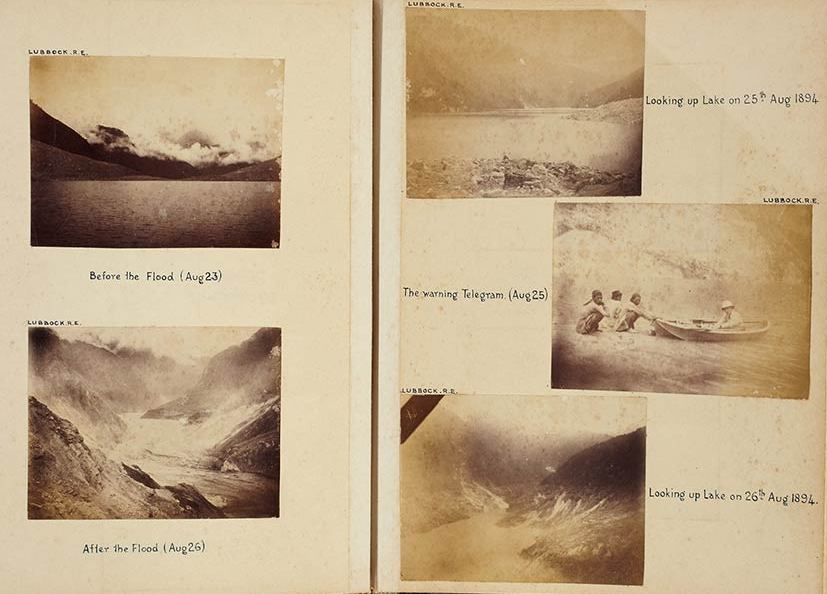
Gohna Lake in 1894

The town of Srinagar was destroyed, but only a family of five died.
