= Frasin mine =

Mine in Romania

Frasin
- Location in Romania
- Location: Bucium, Alba County, Romania; 46°15′50″N 23°10′34″E
- Production: 53,000
- Company: Gabriel Resources
- Acquired: 2003

The Frasin mine is a large open pit mine in the west of Romania in Alba County, 73 km west of Alba Iulia and 467 km north-west of the capital, Bucharest. Frasin represents a large gold deposit with estimated reserves of 1 million oz of gold and 2.96 million oz of silver. The project is owned by the Toronto-based company Gabriel Resources.

The project will involve the mining and processing of 0.97 million tonnes of ore per annum over an open pit life of 19 years. The open pit is expected to yield approximately 53,000 oz of gold and 156,000 oz of silver per year in doré, reflecting an average total process recovery of 68% for gold and 81% for silver.
