= Alburnus Maior (organization) =

Alburnus Maior is a non-governmental organization based in Roşia Montană, Romania. It opposes the proposed gold mining project of Gabriel Resources.
