= Rodu mine =

Open pit mine in Romania

Rodu
- Location in Romania
- Location: Bucium, Alba County, Romania; 46°15′50″N 23°10′34″E
- Production: 42,600
- Company: Gabriel Resources
- Acquired: 2003

The Rodu mine is a large open pit mine in the west of Romania in Alba County, 73 km west of Alba Iulia and 467 km north-west of the capital, Bucharest. Rodu represents a large gold deposit with estimated reserves of 0.81 million oz of gold and 1.7 million oz of silver. The project is owned by the Toronto-based company Gabriel Resources.

The project will involve the mining and processing of 1.37 million tonnes of ore per annum over an open pit life of 19 years. The open pit is expected to yield approximately 42,600 oz of gold and 89,500 oz of silver per year in doré, reflecting an average total process recovery of 68% for gold and 81% for silver.
