= Roșia Montană Project =

Proposed gold mine in Romania

Roșia Montană
- Location within Romania
- Location: Transylvania, Romania; 46°18′17″N 23°6′53″E
- Products: Gold and Silver
- Opened: Cancelled
- Company: Roșia Montană Gold Corporation (majority owned by Gabriel Resources)

Conflict
- Resulted in: Roșia Montană protests

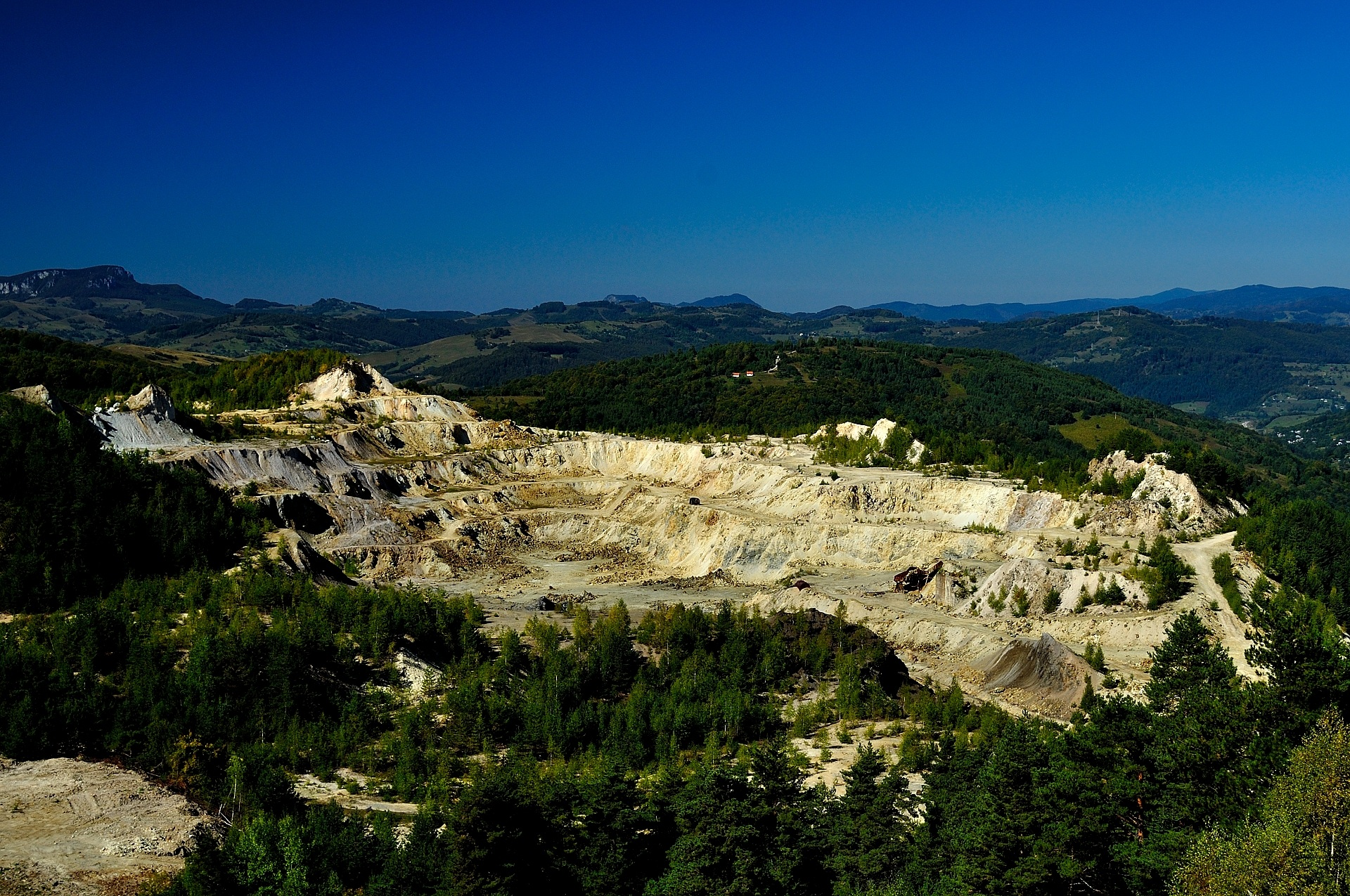
Cetate open-pit gold mine (1971–2006) to be reopened as part of the project

Roșia Montană Project was a proposed gold and silver mine in Roșia Montană, Romania. If approved, it would have become Europe's largest open-pit gold mine and it would have used the gold cyanidation mining technique. The project met with widespread protests in 2013 that indefinitely delayed the project, which saw its end in 2021, when Roșia Montană became a part of the UNESCO World Heritage list and was also included in the List of World Heritage in Danger. Following these measures, any mining activity in Roșia Montană is prohibited in the future.

The project was majority-owned by Canadian mining company Gabriel Resources (with 80.46%) and by state mining company Minvest Deva (19.31%) and other minority shareholders.

Some local residents refused to sell their properties to the Roșia Montană Gold Corporation and, in order for the project to commence, the state would have needed to exercise eminent domain.

== History ==
Frank Timiș, a Romanian-born Australian, founded a company, Gabriel Resources, in the Channel Island of Jersey in 1995. Timiș negotiated with the Romanian state and, in 1996, they signed a contract with state-owned Regia Autonomă a Cuprului Deva for the creation of a joint venture (Eurogold Resources) for the exploitation of auriferous residues from previous exploitations. Gabriel Resources was allowed to have 60% of the shares in the new company but, in a new protocol a year later, the Gabriel Resources stake was increased to 80%, while state's participation (through Minvest) was reduced to 18.8%, while being still allowed to exploit just around the existing mine. The company was renamed "Roșia Montană Gold Corporation" in 1999.

The extraction licenses owned by state-owned Minvest Deva were transferred to the joint venture following a call by Minister of Industries Radu Berceanu in a letter that has since disappeared. Between 1999 and 2000, the operating perimeter was increased from 12 km² to 20 km² and later 42 km^{2} (16 sq mi).

In 2000, RMGC paid $20 million for a pre-feasibility study (done by American company Pincock Allen & Holt) which resulted in an estimate of 8 million ounces of gold. The company invested $250 million (raised from the stock market, banks and mutual funds) and it promised that within three years the project would create 25,000 jobs.

The Social Liberal Union has drifted away from its platform prior to the parliamentary elections and the Government approved a draft law regulating the conditions of participation, passing it to the Parliament for debate. This has sparked massive spontaneous protests still ongoing (see 2013 Romanian protests against the Roșia Montană Project) and the presidential candidate Crin Antonescu unexpectedly declared in a press conference that in his opinion the project should be rejected. The Prime Minister Victor Ponta has also digressed claiming that the Government has approved the bill to prevent being sued for compensations and the Parliament will definitely vote against it closing the subject. Following this development, the Gabriel Resources shares have plummeted.

In November 2013 the Senate of Romania rejected the project, followed by the Chamber of Deputies in June 2014.

== Technical aspects ==
Gabriel Resources, the Canadian majority owner of the project, ran a geological survey in 2000, which gave an estimation of 330 tons of gold and 1600 tons of silver in the four mountains surrounding the town of Roșia Montană, if the exploitation would use blasting and cyanide extraction.

The project would grind a large quantity of rock: 218 million tons according to the technical file of the project or 262 million tons according to the project memorandum, resulting tailings having particles with a diameter between 74 and 150 micrometres. The tailings would be leached with cyanides in order to extract the gold; due to the small diameter of the particles, the resulting sludge would have a large quantity of cyanide compounds: according to RMGC estimates, about 500 tons, out of a total of 214.9 million tons of sludge.

The sludge would be deposited in a 45-hectare tailings pond, which would be built on the valley of the Corna River, requiring a dam 600 metres wide and 185 metres high and changing the course of river.

=== Geology ===
Roșia Montană Gold Corporation claimed that the pond would be safe from infiltration due to the impermeable clay formations on the hillsides. This was disputed in a 2013 report by the Geological Institute of Romania, which claimed that the company ignored the real geological context as the left hillside is made of highly porous sandstone. The Institute argued that the valley cannot be used safely to deposit such a large quantity of tailings and proposed as a solution the reduction of the quantity of tailings through a flotation process combined with porosity sealing of the bottom of the pond.

The Geological Institute also voiced concerns that the method of exploitation would lead to the loss of large quantities of germanium, tellurium, arsenic, lead, and zinc. The existence of notable quantities of copper, lead and zinc in the ore would lead to an increase in the usage of cyanide, a lower recovery rate for gold and silver, as well as leading to sulphocyanide-rich sludge. The company denies the existence of metals in notable quantities, which is contradicted by the Geological Institute.

In October 2013, during the hearing at the Senate, Ștefan Marincea, the President of the Geological Institute, accused his predecessor of signing a notice saying there are no fault lines in Roșia Montană, which Marincea contended is false and that there are many fault lines in the area. Marincea also argued that changing the course of the Cernea River is not possible because of the springs on the bottom of the Corna Valley.

== Opposition ==
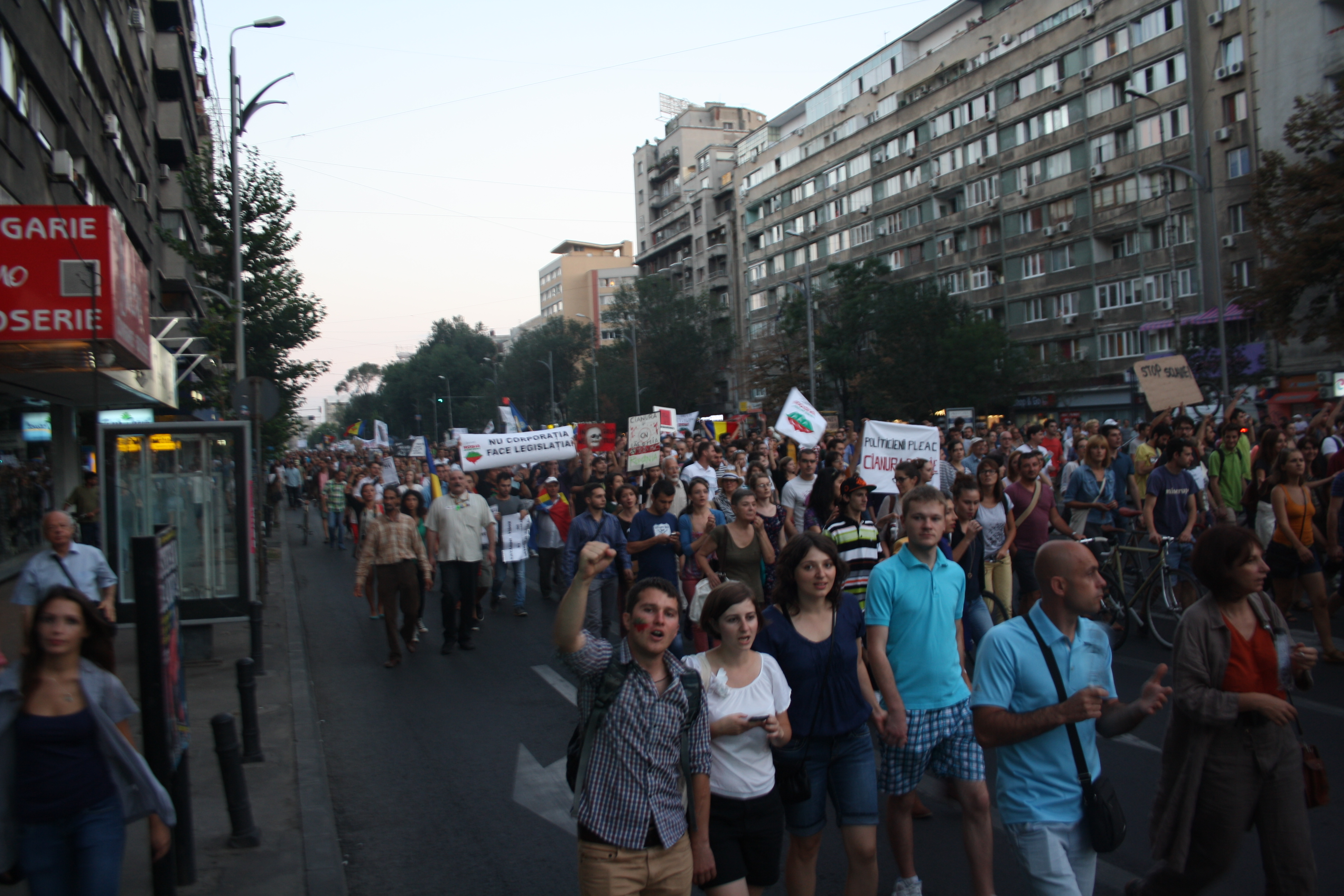
Protesters against the mining project marching in Bucharest 1 September

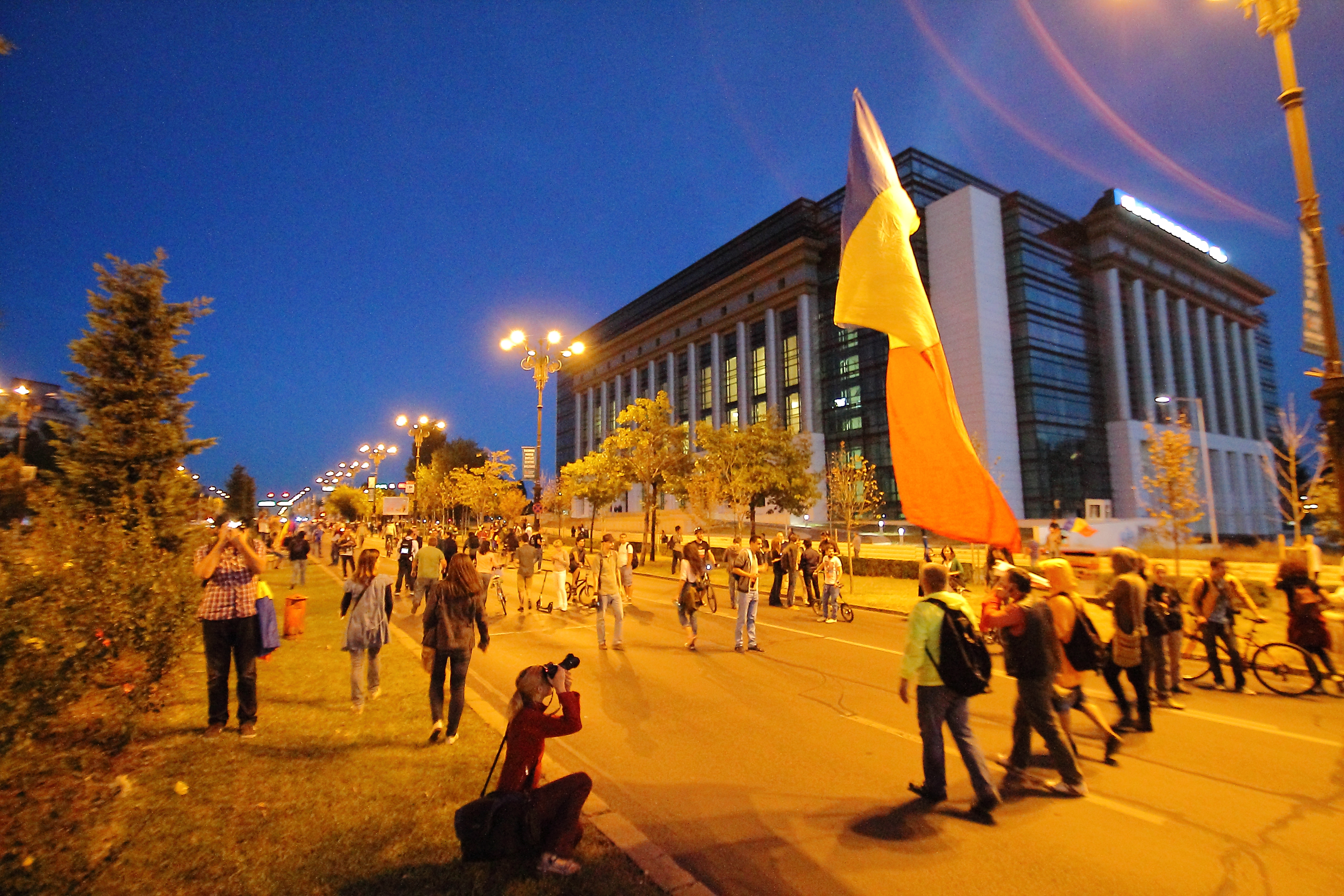
Protesters against the mining project marching in Bucharest 15 September

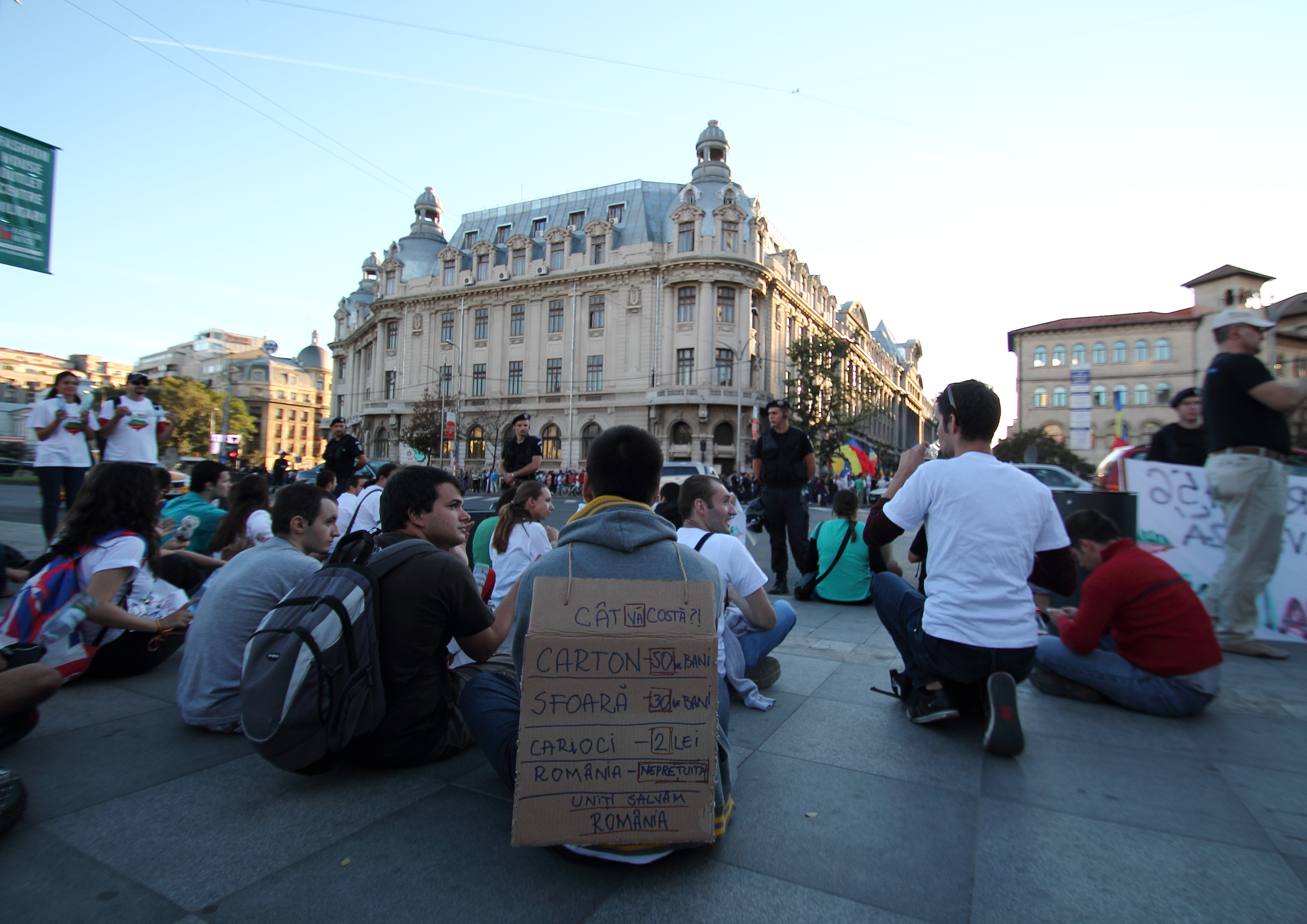
Protesters against the mining project sitting in Bucharest on 15 September 2013

Opposition to the project was originally organized by Eugen David, a local farmer who refused to sell his land to Roșia Montană Gold Corporation. He was among the founders of "Alburnus Maior", an association of activists bearing the Roman name of the town. David gained the support of Teddy Goldsmith, an Anglo-French environmentalist and of Swiss-born journalist Stephanie Danielle Roth, who moved to Roșia Montană to help David's quest.

With help from Stephanie Danielle Roth, David's group was able to obtain grants from international NGOs (including George Soros's Open Society Institute) and to raise the issue of the mine on national level by organizing a hearing with 40 Romanian NGOs, including sections of international organizations such as Greenpeace. Alburnus Maior gained support from British actress Vanessa Redgrave, who, when receiving a prize at the Transilvania International Film Festival, she used her acceptance speech to bring the issue of the project, which led to coverage in the international press.

A number of organizations and groups opposed the project, including a group of 83 Romanian professors of economics, a group of artists and intellectuals (among which Horia-Roman Patapievici, the head of the Romanian Cultural Institute) who published a letter in The Guardian in 2006 and a number of international archeologists who voiced their concerns over the destruction of the area's unique Roman mines. The major churches of Romania, the Romanian Orthodox Church, the Roman Catholic Churcha and the Greek-Catholic Church, oppose the project, as does the Romanian Academy.

On 1 September 2013 thousands of Romanians protested against the project in dozens of cities across the country, the protests continuing the following days in Bucharest.

== Environment ==
Major issues regarding the environmental impact of the Roșia Montană Project regard the usage of cyanides, as well as the practice of open-pit mining, which would require the usage of a large area, including four mountains, which would, according to the opponents, "be turned into a desert".

The usage of cyanides has been a contentious issue, especially due to the fears of spillage into rivers and the groundwater. This fear was augmented by the precedent of another gold mining company in Romania, which similarly promised a state-of-the-art, self-contained, environmental-friendly project, having a dam burst (see 2000 Baia Mare cyanide spill) and the cyanide-laced water of the tailings pond flowed into the Danube, leading to one of Europe's biggest environmental disasters.

The company claims that the local area has been polluted by 2000 years of bad mining techniques and that its environmental-impact analysis shows that the project will help restore the environment. The analysis was however described as bad science by a government panel in Hungary, which claimed that its data is "insufficient, deficient, inaccurate or not considered to be representative".

Since Romania joined the EU, mining in Romania is now subject to strict regulations regarding cyanide concentration. The Rosia Montana mine complies with these regulations and its cyanide concentration will be 20 times less than that of the Baia Mare mine.

== Archeology and heritage ==
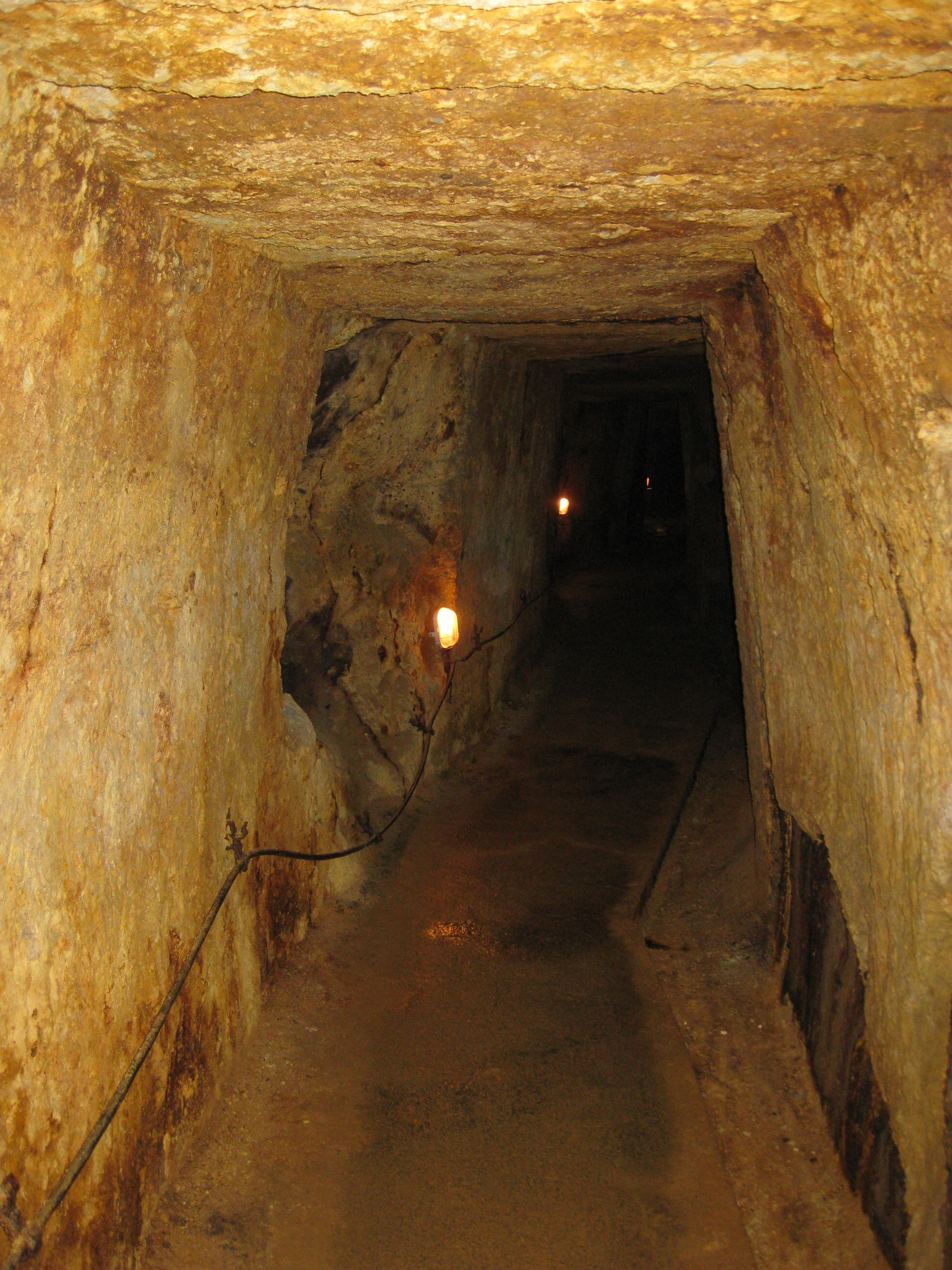
Roman mining gallery; most of such galleries would have to be destroyed

In order for the project to proceed, a number of archeological sites, as well as some historic buildings must be destroyed.

This includes large parts of the well-preserved 2000-year-old Roman mine galleries, which have attracted talk of a possible nomination to become a UNESCO World Heritage site.

== Economics ==
The company attempted to get a $100 million loan from the World Bank in 2002, however the loan was canceled at the personal intervention of World Bank president James Wolfensohn.

== Allegations of corruption ==
The Roșia Montană Project has been widely accused by opponents, the media and politicians as being corrupt. For instance, a Deutsche Welle editorial said that the project "practiced bribery through professional and systematic processes". The "Alliance for a Clean Romania", an NGO that fights corruption in Romania called for the project to be canceled due to the "non-transparent manner" through which everything was developed.

Politicians, both on the left and right sides of the political spectrum, accused their adversaries of being bribed in order to support the mining project. While in opposition, Social-Democratic leader Victor Ponta opposed the project claiming that the Roșia Montană Project stalled because "not all politicians can be bought like President Băsescu". On the other side of the political spectrum, Democratic-Liberal MP Theodor Paleologu claimed to oppose the project due to "the corruption of politicians and journalists". In October 2013, Liberal Senator Sorin Roșca Stănescu accused Traian Băsescu of receiving bribes from RMGC over the Roșia Montană Project through an offshore bank account in Seychelles.

== Media and portrayals ==
=== Advertising ===
Gabriel Resources has a big advertising budget, receiving a systematically biased favorable campaign media coverage from certain newspapers and television stations. The controversy includes commercials being withdrawn due to unsupported claims and Gabriel Resources employees spamming online editions of media outlets and blogs with editorial oversight with favorable propaganda using proxies when necessary.

=== Documentaries ===
The debate over the Rosia Montana mine project inspired four documentaries.

A short documentary, The price of gold, showing views of both sides was released in 2004. Worthy persons like Ionel Haiduc, President of the Romanian Academy, Ioan Piso, Director of the National History Museum of Transylvania in Cluj-Napoca, Ștefan Răgălie, General Director of Industrial Economics Department of the Romanian Academy, Corina Borș, archaeologist, etc. expressed their firm disapproval regarding the mining project.

The controversies surrounding the Roșia Montană gold mine project are explored in a documentary entitled Gold Futures by Tibor Kocsis. This film presented the plight of the anti-Gold Corporation residents of Rosia Montana, with a strong emphasis on the cultural and natural treasures of the area. The tourism attracted by the natural beauty and tranquillity of this isolated spot of the world is presented versus the risks of using huge amounts of cyanide in the gold ore processing. Gold Futures was based on Kocsis' previous multiple award-winning documentary on the subject entitled: "New Eldorado. Gold. The Curse of Rosia Montana."

More recently a new documentary partially funded by Gabriel Resources, Mine Your Own Business, asserts that environmentalists' opposition to the mine locks people into poverty. The film claims that the majority of the people of the village support the mine, and the investment. The film presents foreign environmentalists as alien agents opposed to progress while residents are depicted as eagerly awaiting the new opportunity.

In 2012 the director Fabian Daub released an hour-long documentary about the story of Roșia Montană.

In November 2013, the freelance journalist Mihai Gotiu launched his book „The Roşia Montană Affair” („Afacerea Roşia Montană”). The author followed the unfolding of the project at Roşia Montana for the last 11 years, and the book presents his findings, including internal documents of the Roșia Montană Gold Corporation, diplomatic mail, and other documents that suggest lobbying strategies and pressures from important figures in Washington, London, Brussels or Bucharest.

== See also ==
- Roșia Poieni copper mine
