= Roșia Montană protests =

2013 protests in Romania

2013 Roșia Montană Protests
- Part of 2012–14 unrest in Romania
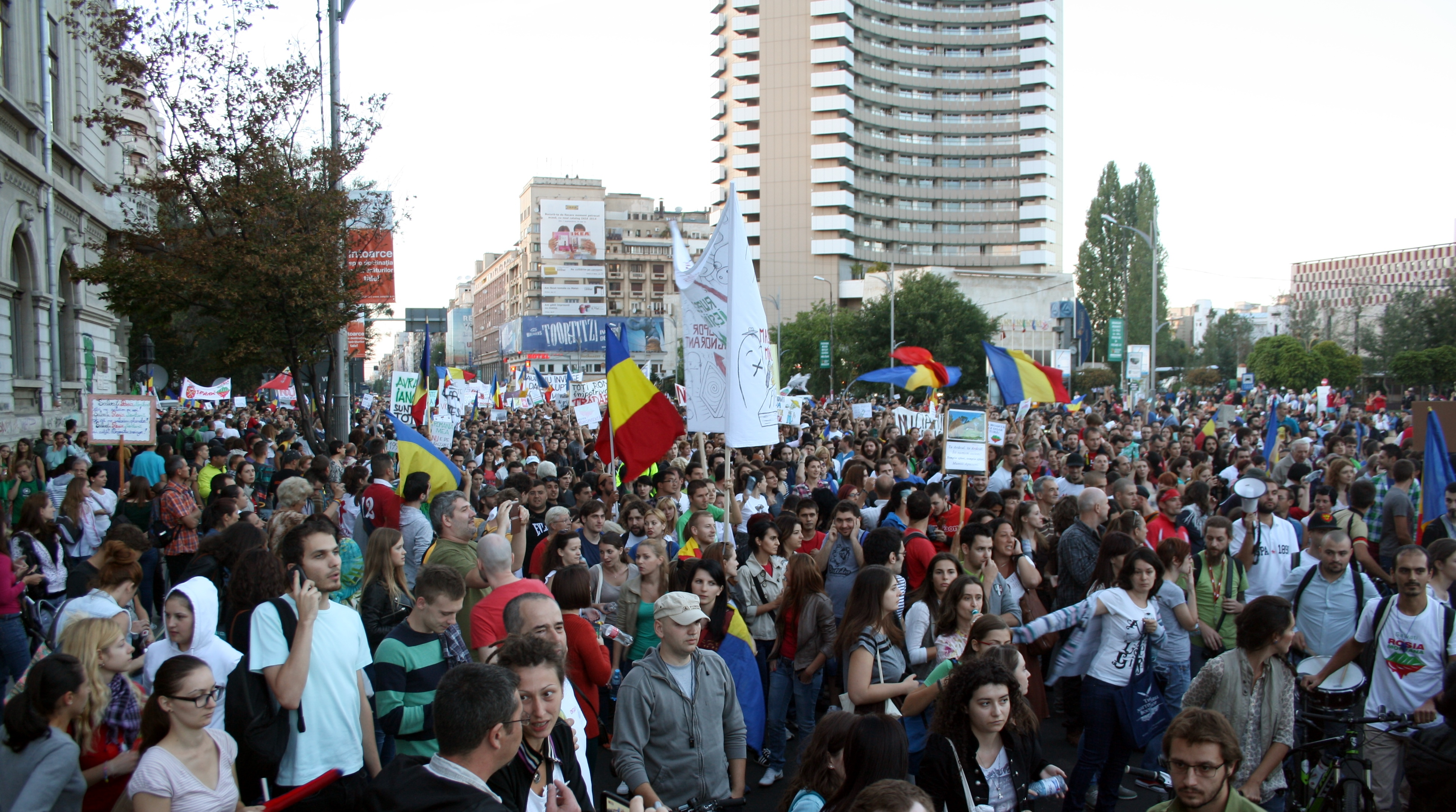
- Date: 1 September 2013 – 11 February 2014 (5 months, 10 days,)
- Location: 50 cities across Romania; 30 cities in Romanian diaspora
- Caused by: Suspicion of long-time health effects due to cyanide; Pollution threat of water supplies and rivers; Destruction threat of local ecosystem; Large-scale deforestation threat; Doubtful environmental situation after the closing of Roșia Montană Project in event of exploitation; Destruction threat of landscape; Destruction threat of historic monuments; Suspicion of fake documentation regarding the mining project; Governmental attempts to break the Rule of Law; Governmental dismissal of public servants who opposed the project; Governmental intervention in Justice; Secret agreements between Government and Roșia Montană Gold Corporation; Governmental silence over royalties for rare-earth elements; Initial lack of governmental transparency over Roșia Montană Project; Low rate of royalties for minerals; Conviction that political class is not pursuing the national interest; Suspicion of political bribery; Uncertain position of lawmakers over the project; Indifference of authorities and lawmakers to citizens' requests; Insults brought by Prime Minister against protesters; Media blackout; Aggressive pro-mining propaganda; Doubtful local employment situation after the closing of Roșia Montană Project in event of exploitation
- Goals: Rejection of the bill; Banning gold cyanidation in Romania; Registration of Roșia Montană on Romania's tentative list for UNESCO; Rejection of the environmental agreement; Resignation of political supporters of the project including; the environment minister Rovana Plumb, the culture minister Daniel Barbu and; the prime minister Victor Ponta
- Methods: Sit-in; Demonstration; Occupation; Protest march; Civil disobedience; Roadblock; Die-in; Boycott; Human chain; Flash mob; Online activism
- Concessions: Rejection of the bill as passed by the Government; Rejection of mining law

Number
200,000	

Casualties and losses
Arrests: 118; Injuries: 2	

The Roșia Montană Protests were a series of protests in 2013 in Bucharest, Cluj-Napoca, Iași and dozens of other cities in Romania and abroad against the Roșia Montană mining project. Protesters said that the mining project would destroy the environment and heritage of Roșia Montană and demanded the withdrawal of a law which would enable this project to commence. In Bucharest, protests were held every evening in the University Square and marches were held each Sunday.

Although at first largely ignored by the world press, the demonstrations started to receive more significant worldwide attention both by the media and the general population via the use of social networks. The protests were dubbed the Indignants Movement (Romanian: Mișcarea Indignaților) and Romanian Autumn (Romanian: Toamna Românească). by the Romanian press.

== Background ==
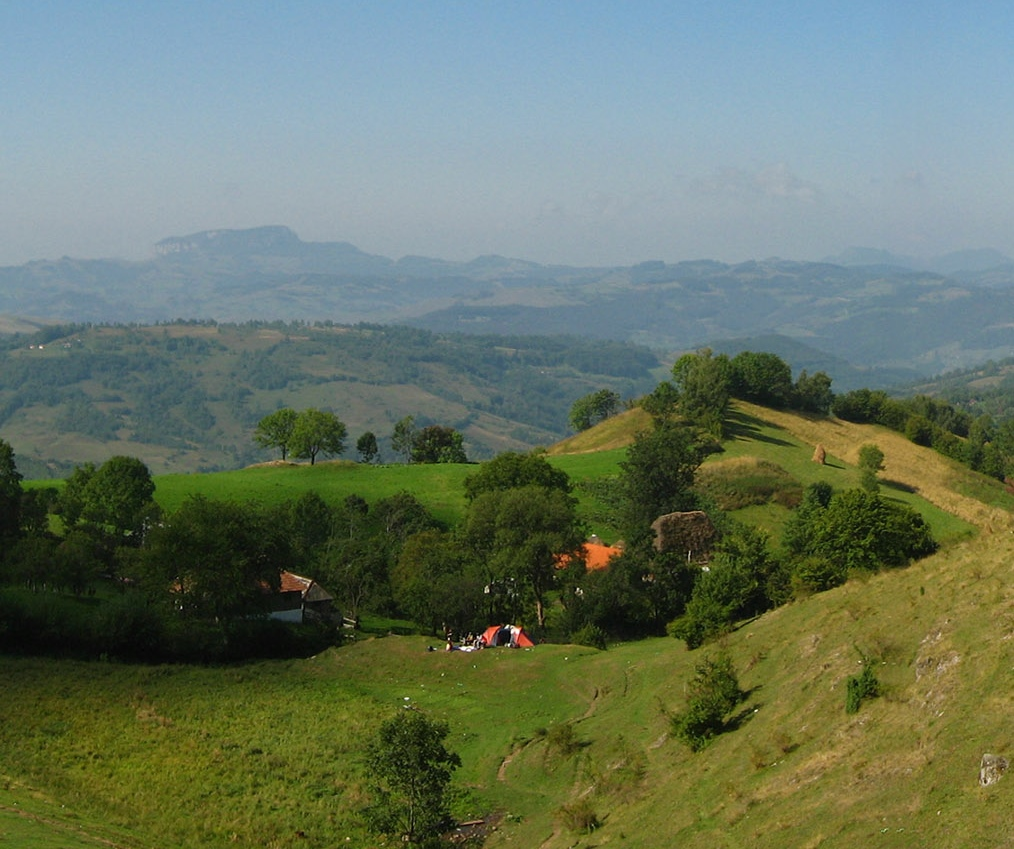
Roșia Montană, a small town in Transylvania where the mining project is supposed to be built

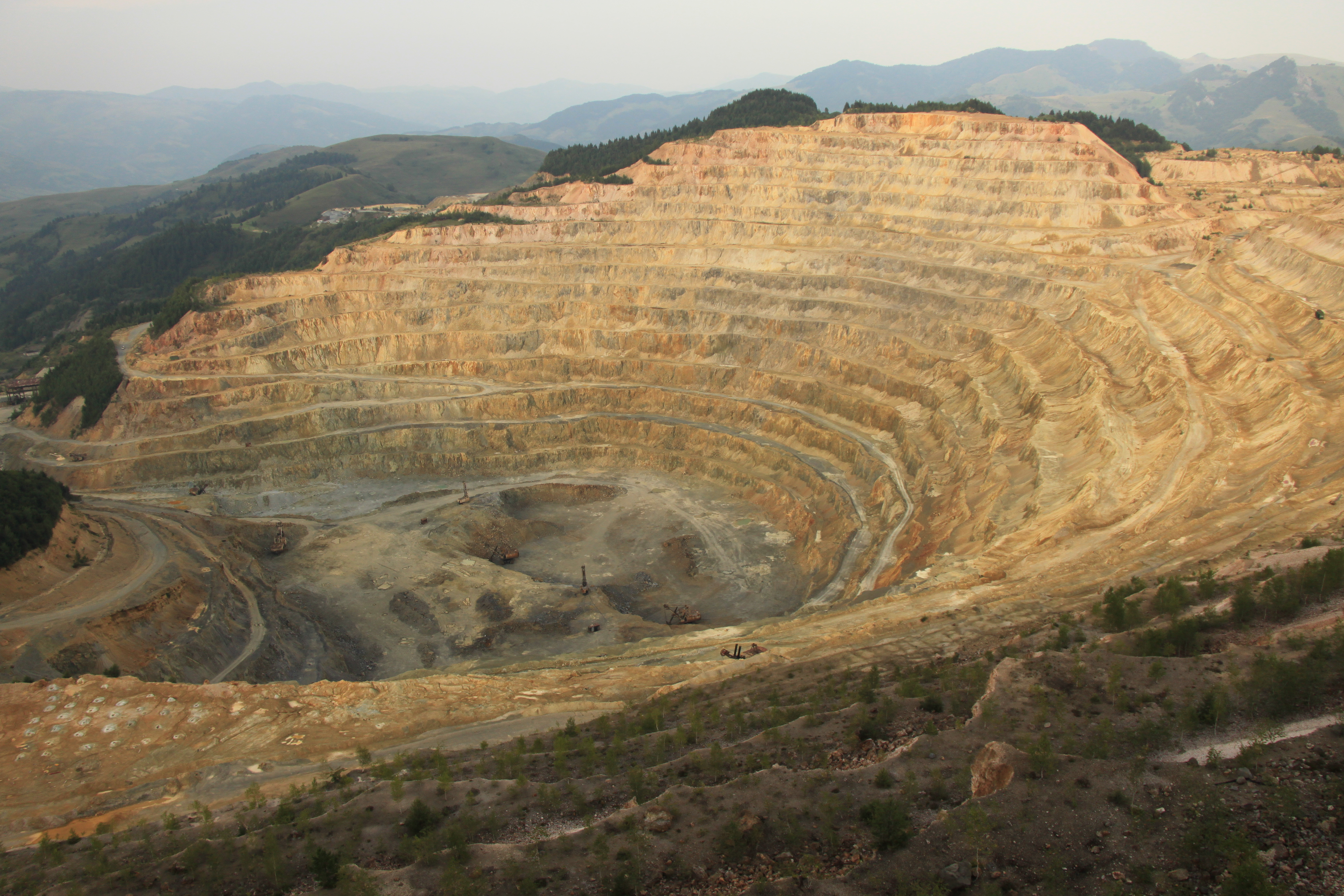
An open-pit mining project (Roșia Poieni)

The Roșia Montană Project was initiated by Roșia Montană Gold Corporation, a company of which the largest shareholder is the Canada-based Gabriel Resources. The company was given in 2000, without bidding, a license for mining gold. The open-pit mining project proposed to use cyanide to extract gold and was expected to require the razing of three villages and destruction of four mountain tops. It would have been Europe's largest open-pit gold mine, using 12,000 tonnes of cyanide yearly, and yielding 350 tonnes of gold and 1,500 tonnes of silver.

The Roșia Montană campaign was originally organized by locals of Roșia Montană who refused to be relocated and battled the corporation for years in the courts. The activists claimed that the project would cause an environmental disaster, that it would destroy the ancient Roman archeological sites and that the project involved handing assets to the Canadian company, while the Romanian state would earn only 6% out of the project.

Within the last 14 years, the company was not able to obtain all the needed permits due to failure to comply with the Romanian environment laws. The ruling Social Democrats made a campaign promise before the 2012 legislative elections to stop the project, but they changed their mind after winning the elections In order for the project to continue, the Romanian government approved a new draft law in late August 2013 and forwarded it to the Parliament which had to vote on it in September.

A concern was that the legislation would give the Roșia Montană Gold Corporation the right to give compulsory purchase orders to the residents of Roșia Montană who refused to sell their houses and lands. The draft law also sets time limits for the state authorities to grant all permits, regardless of potential infringements of national legislation or of court rulings.

== Protests ==
The protests tend to follow a weekly pattern, with the first day of protests, Sunday, 1 September being the starter for this routine. To this day, all over the country the major protests are held on Sundays, with the weekdays being reserved for local or minor protests, the Saturdays for mass alternative ways of spreading information about the protest and the Sundays peaking with the most people joining in all major cities. Since its beginning, every major Sunday protest has grown exponentially in numbers.

The protests were organized in cities across the country, with thousands of people in Bucharest and Cluj-Napoca. Protests were held across Europe, with an estimated 150–200 Romanians and environmentalists protesting in London. The protests, organized during the evenings, involved the protesters blocking streets, drumming, singing and organizing sit-ins in the street. In Berlin and Brussels (in front of the UNESCO Headquarters), the protests included a die-in. In Chicago, members of the Romanian community, solidary with the Roșia Montană protest movement, joined a spontaneous protest inside the consulate in Chicago. The protest took place at the Romanian Prime Minister's visit to the United States. People have made an open letter to Prime Minister Victor Ponta, through which they demand the ban of cyanide mining and shale gas exploitation in Romania.

Some protesters called upon President Băsescu's and Prime-Minister Ponta's resignations, both politicians being supporters of the project.

The 'Save Roșia Montană' campaign is now regarded as the largest civic movement in Romania since the 1989 revolution.

=== Rallies ===
Rallies are held every evening in Bucharest's University Square. They result every time in traffic delays.

On Tuesday, 10 September, in the middle of the street, in front of the university, a string quartet played to the protesters classical and modern music, including Metallica's "Nothing Else Matters". The following Tuesday, near the fountain next to the university, a group of 50 dancers organized a flash mob dancing tango.

On 21 September, nearly 7,000 people formed a human chain around the Palace of the Parliament. They were joined by thousands of cyclists, that marched around the building.

On 4 October, several paragliders from Cluj jumped from height at Dezmir Aerodrome, displaying messages for the salvation of Roșia Montană. They were joined by dozens of young people coming to protest.

==== Great Gathering and Proclamation of Câmpeni ====
More than 5,000 residents of Câmpeni, Alba County, gathered in city's centre to protest against cyanide mining project at Roșia Montană and against the Ponta Government. They were joined by thousands of activists from all major cities of the country. People are outraged because declarations of PM Victor Ponta who argued that in Câmpeni would protest extremist groups and that authorities are prepared to intervene. They accuse the entire political class of manipulation and betrayal.

The organizers of this event, supported by protesters, drew up a proclamation with clear and concise claims.

1. Rejection by Parliament of all draft laws that provide special measures for the expropriation of Romanian citizens, and other measures derogating from the statutory of protection of environment, cultural heritage, water, meadows and agricultural land, public goods etc., in behalf of mining companies of any kind;
2. Legal prohibition of the use of cyanide in mining activities in Romania;
3. Inclusion of Roșia Montană on Romania's tentative list for UNESCO;
4. Rejection of emergency, by Government Decision, of the environmental permit for the mining project in Roșia Montană;
5. Declassification of all contracts and addenda signed by the Government, concerning alienation, lease and concession of Romania's mineral resources;
6. Resignation of initiators of special bill for Roșia Montană: Minister of Great Projects, Dan Șova, Environment Minister, Rovana Plumb, Minister of Culture, Daniel Barbu, Director of the National Agency for Mineral Resources, Gheorghe Duțu, and Prime Minister Victor Ponta;
7. Assumption by the Government of expertise and views on mining project in Roșia Montană expressed by: Romanian Academy, Ad Astra Association, Romanian Geological Institute, Order of Architects of Romania, Synod of the Romanian Orthodox Church, Synod of the Romanian Church United with Rome, Greek-Catholic and the other Christian churches in Romania, as well as independent experts;
8. Creation of a Parliamentary Commission of Inquiry on Roșia Montană Project in all aspects: alienation of deposits; sponsorship of RMGC by public and private institutions, NGOs, individuals; influencing policy decisions; infringement of final judgment; manner in which advertising provided by the company affected press freedom and freedom of expression etc.;
9. Restoration and development of road infrastructure in the Apuseni Mountains and granting of tax incentives and other economic development activities in the following domains: tourism, woodworking and forest restoration, growing and processing of animal products, apiculture, other activities specific to the area;
10. Adoption by the Romanian Government of public policies, as development, with the aid of real civil society, of a strategy that provides measures in line with sustainable development, optimal use of resources, preservation of cultural and historical heritage and supporting local entrepreneurs;
11. Beginning by authorized institutions of criminal investigation in case of the people who have signed or participated in the development and approval of documents concerning the mining project in Roșia Montană;
12. Legal prohibition of the use of hydraulic fracturing method in shale gas exploitation and respecting, in target areas for this operation, the sovereign will of citizens, wherewith we express our full solidarity.

— Proclamation of Câmpeni – 19 October 2013, rosiamontana.org
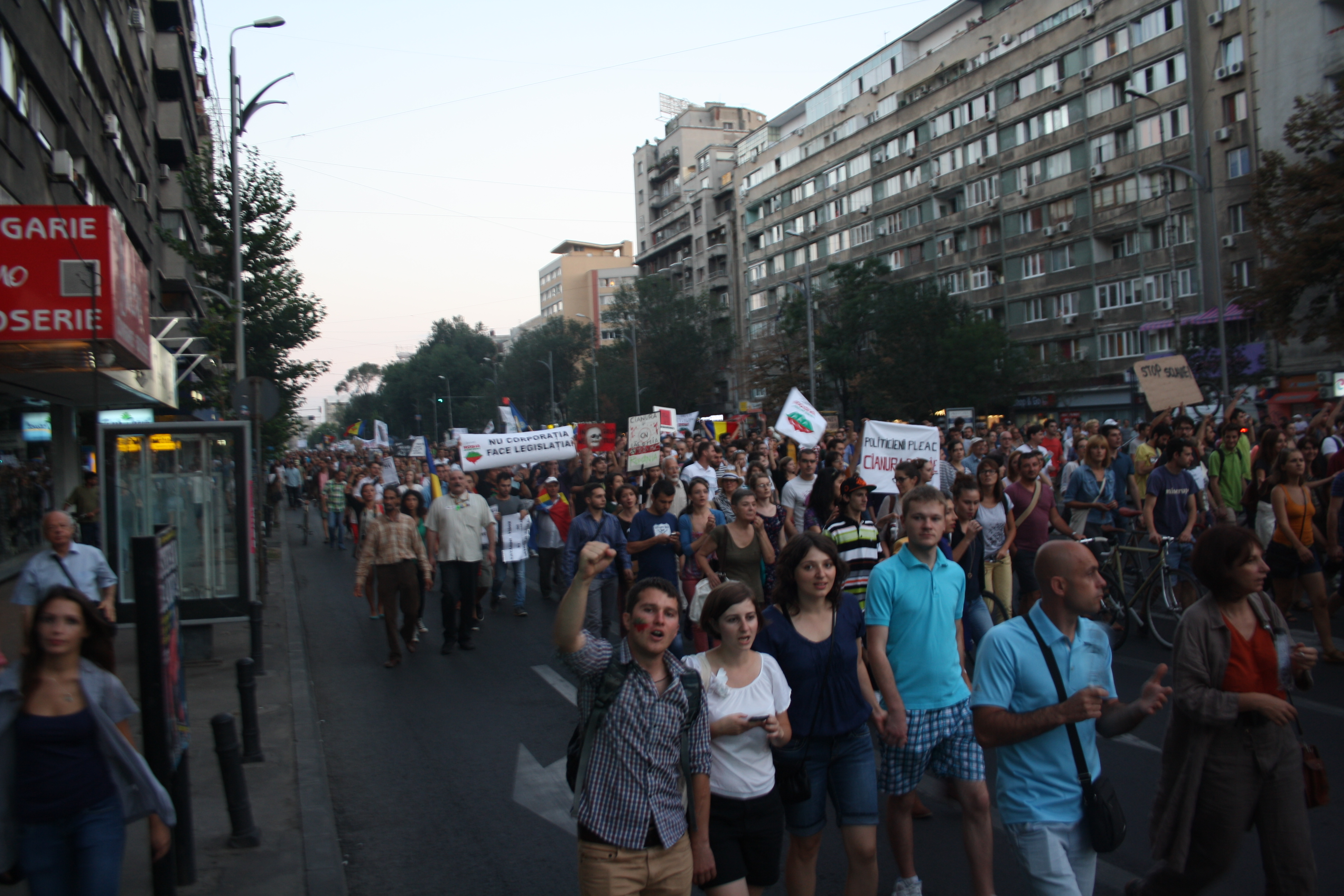
Magheru Boulevard filled by protesters, 1 September

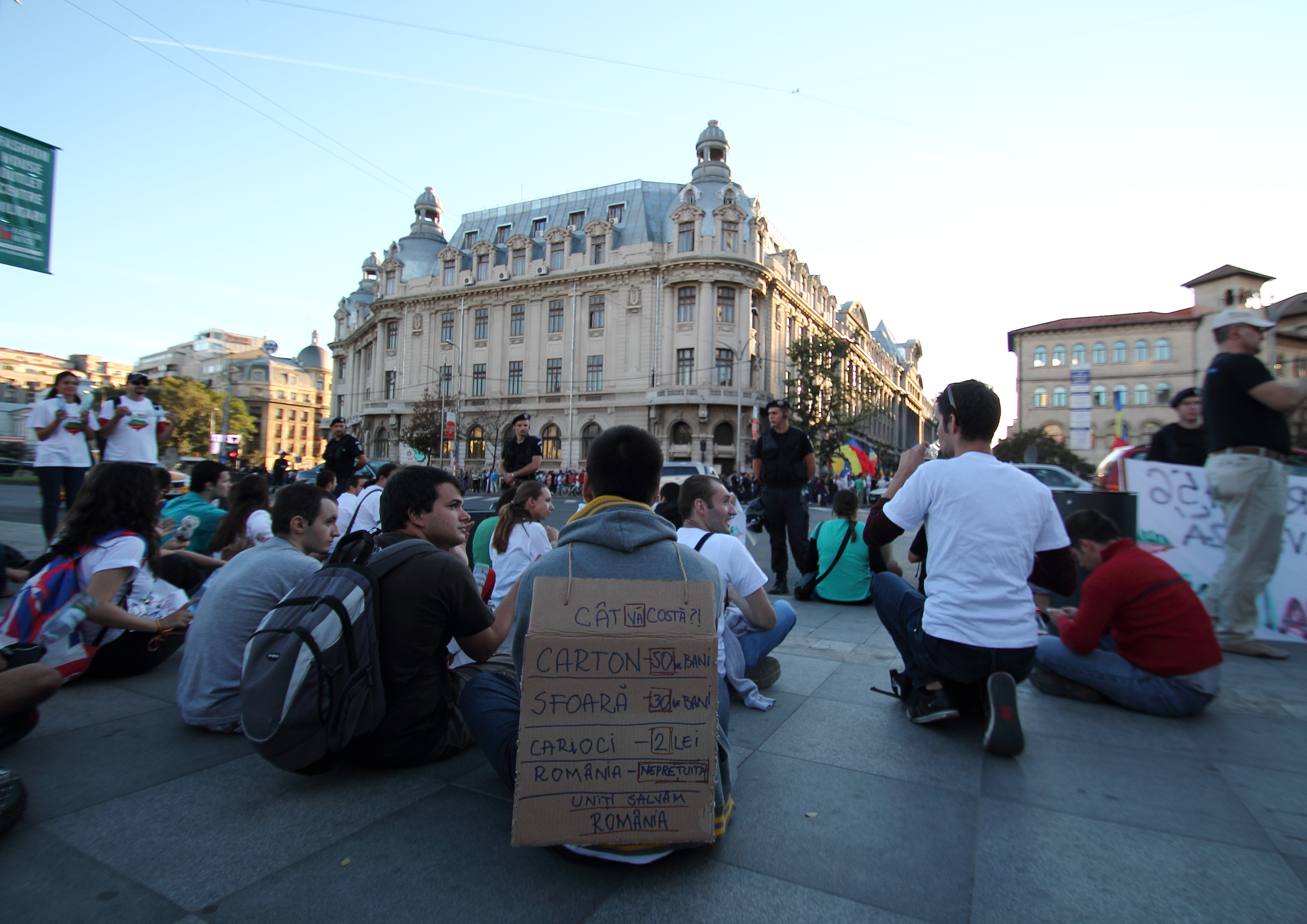
Sit-in, University Square, 15 September

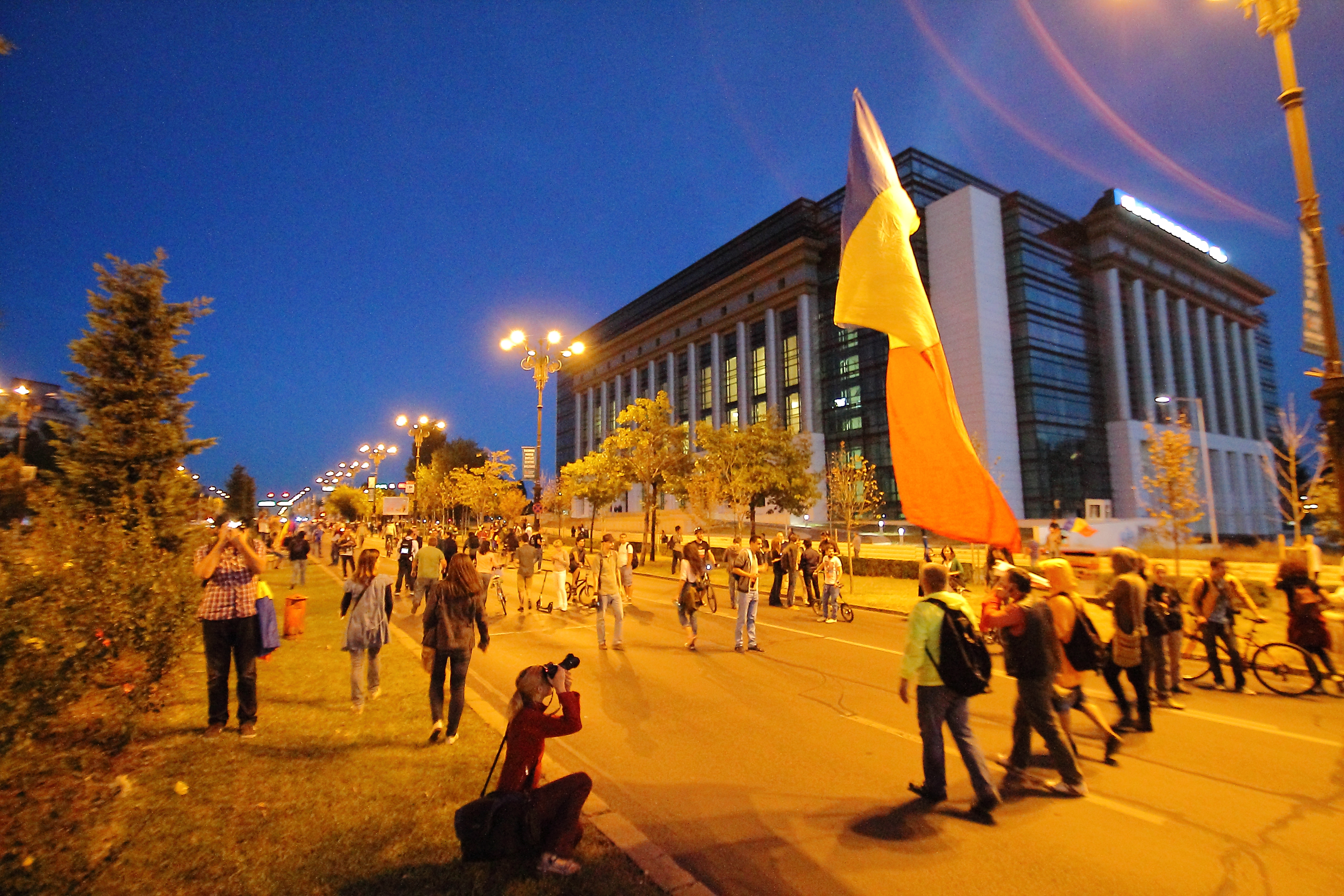
People marching near National Library, on 15 September

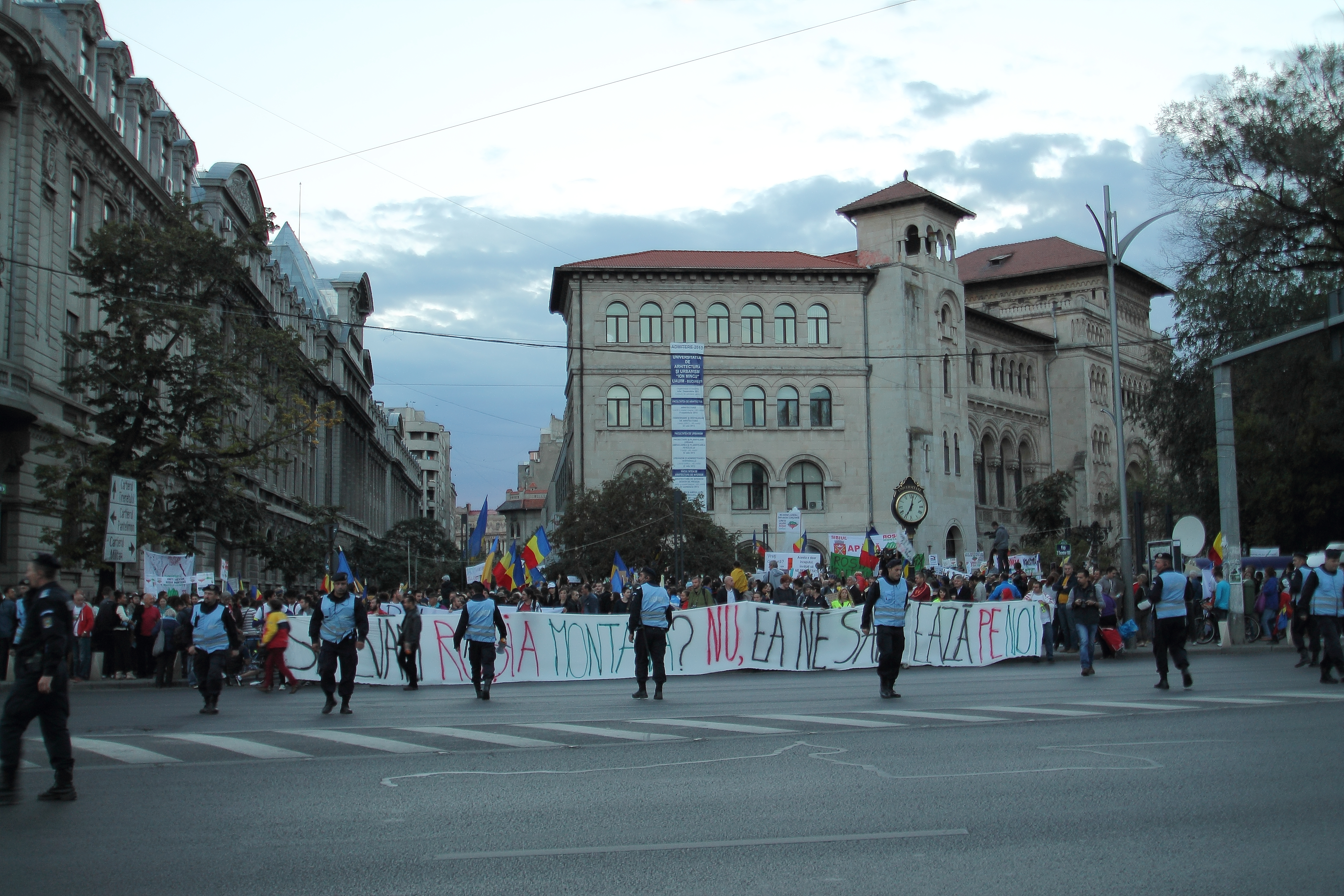
Demonstrators near Faculty of Architecture, Bucharest, on 22 September

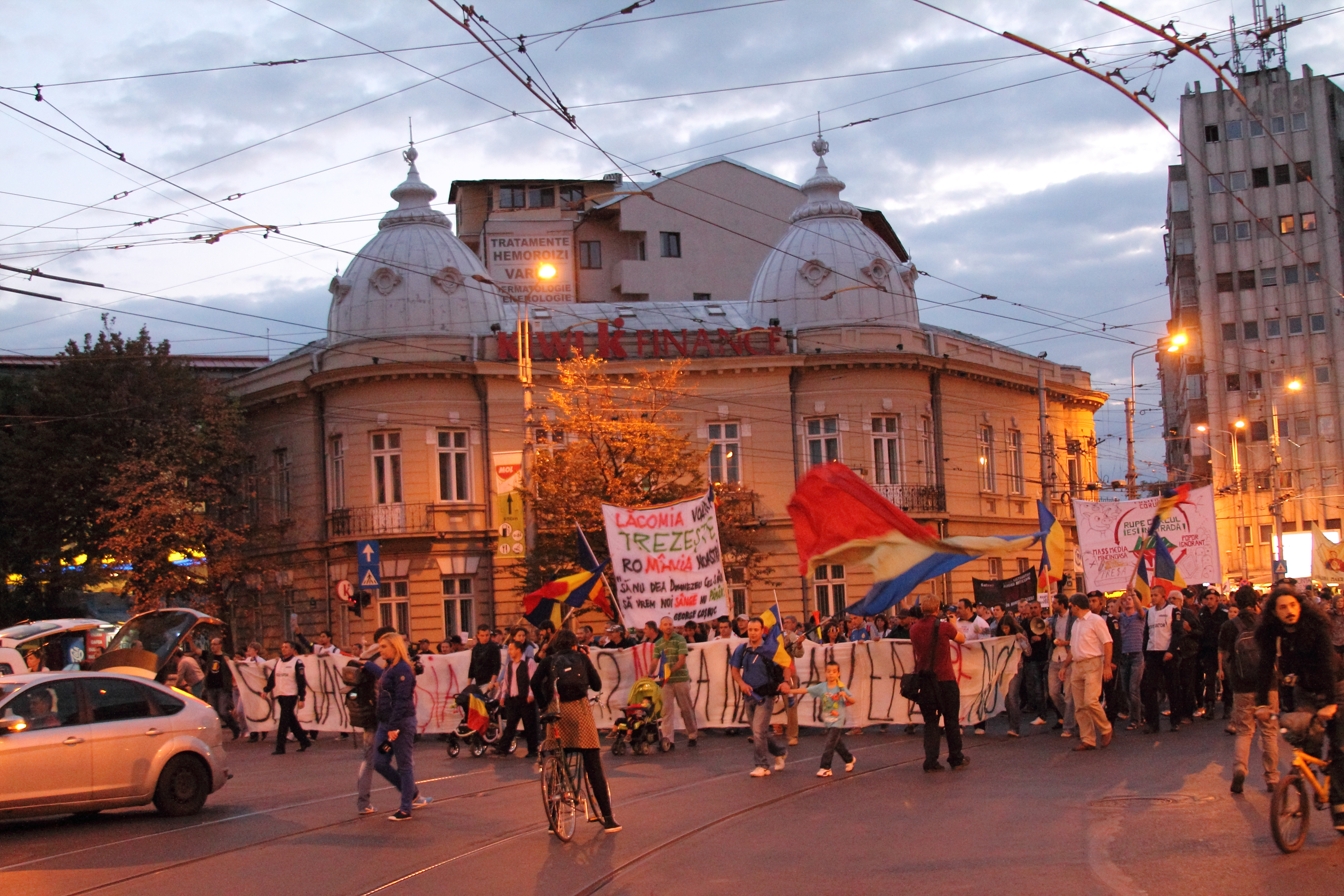
Column of protesters on Carol Boulevard, Bucharest, on 22 September

=== Marches ===
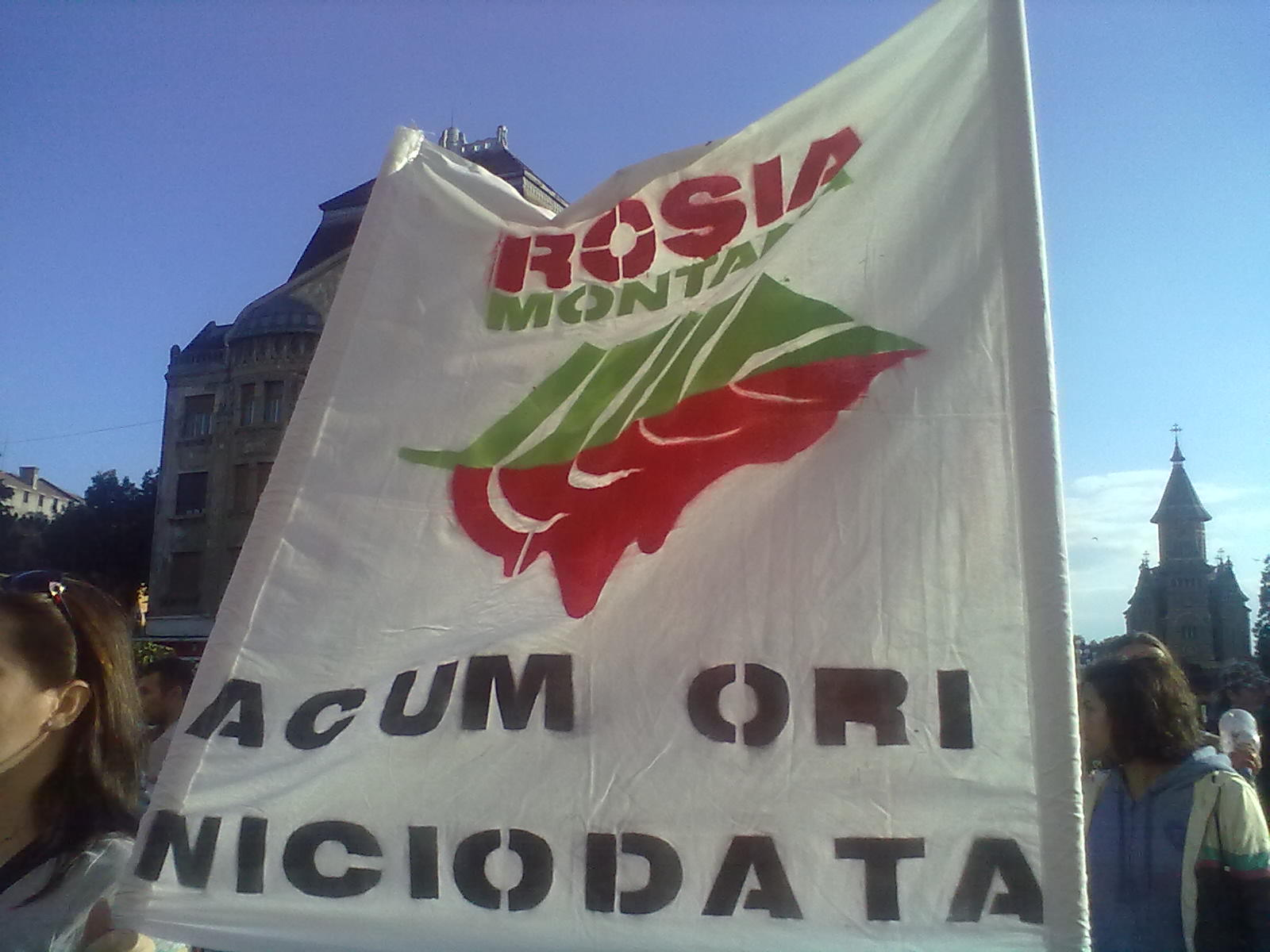
A banner reading "Now or never" during a protest march in Timișoara, on 22 September

As the media, particularly the TV stations, failed to cover properly the protests, the protesters marched each Sunday for hours throughout the neighbourhoods of Bucharest in order to spread the word of the protests.

Also, slogans opposing the ongoing project of shale gas fracking were shouted and bystanders were invited to join. On 15 and 22 September, tens of thousands of protesters took to the streets again, including more than 22,000 in Bucharest.

=== Incidents ===
Although the protests are generally peaceful in conduct, some incidents were reported. In the first day of protests, a group of protesters tried to break into the government headquarters, but were stopped by gendarmes. Some teenagers who had joined the protesters jostled with law enforcement officers and threw firecrackers. In Cluj-Napoca, protesters lit smoke-producing objects. In Bucharest, Timișoara and Iași, protesters installed tents on the roads, blocking the traffic on major arteries of circulation.

The Minister of Culture, Daniel Barbu, was attacked by protesters with tomatoes in front of the prefecture in Cluj-Napoca on 13 September. The crowds demanded the resignation of the minister and displayed banners that read "Barbu, gold mercenary, against the patrimony" and "Roșia Montană in UNESCO". One of the protesters was forcibly removed from the minister's car by gendarmes. A similar incident took place in Bucharest historical centre, on 17 October, when Barbu faced an angry crowd after a debate in Club A. Protesters booed Barbu, who yelled at them "You're neofascists". After he got into his car, the windshield was broken when he closed the door. According to Barbu, this was due to stones thrown by protesters, but according to other reports, the windshield had been cracked beforehand, presumably by protesters. Following the incident three protesters were arrested and 40 others heard at local police station.

On 25 September, a group of 1,000 protesters gathered in front of a restaurant in Câmpeni, Alba County where the members of the Parliamentary Commission for Roșia Montană were dining, preventing them from getting out of its courtyard. Their minivan was able to exit following an intervention of the gendarmes.

Those attending the protests accuse the authorities of initiating repression against protesters, after, on 27 October and 3 November, protesters in Bucharest, Brașov and Cluj-Napoca were hit and sprayed with irritant substances by gendarmes. Some of the anti-Roșia Montană demonstrators revealed by documents the aggressions of law enforcement and pressures they made (large fines, threats, etc.) to end anti-government protests.

On 9 December, about 50 Greenpeace activists from 10 countries entered the courtyard of the Parliament building and began to "dig for gold", displaying banners with the message "Gold mining area". Activists were seized by gendarmes and led to the sections 17 and 18 of the Police.

== Protesters' profile ==
The protesters belonged to a wide range of social strata: students, teachers, priests, activists, artists, engineers, retired and unemployed people. They did not share a common ideology, but rather being a heterogenous mix of left and right wing-oriented people, including conservatives, libertarians, socialists, anticapitalists, nationalists, conspiracy theorists etc. Due to a vast majority of the protesters being young professionals, the protests have on occasion been called, both by its critics and its supporters, "the protest of the hipsters".

Although there were relatively few, the existence of anti-capitalist young people among the protesters surprised many commentators. Dan Tapalagă of Hotnews argues that for people of his generation (who overthrew the Communist Party), it is hard to understand what the young people are thinking. Marius Ghilezan of Evenimentul Zilei blamed the parents for "failing to give their children a pro-capitalist view".

The protests had a non-hierarchical nature and no official leaders and have been organized through Facebook.

According to sociologist Mircea Kivu, while during the first day of protests as many as 90% of the protesters were young, as the number of participants increased the following Sundays, the percentage of young people decreased to two-thirds.

=== Participants ===
Princess Brianna Caradja, a declared opponent of the mining project, was among those who joined the protests in Bucharest. She also took part in the nationwide protests in 2012. Other public figures participating in the demonstrations were the PDL deputy Theodor Paleologu, who said he would oppose the project at the vote in Parliament, and the vocalist of rock band Luna Amară, Mihnea Blidariu.

Csibi Magor, Romania Program Director of World Wide Fund for Nature, Claudiu Crăciun, lecturer at the Faculty of Political Sciences, Remus Cernea, a well-known activist, and Cristian Neagoe, consultant at Cărturești Foundation were among those present during the protests in University Square.

== Media portrayal ==
External media

Images
- Save Roșia Montană protest (5 September) on Flickr
- Save Roșia Montană protest (11 September) on Flickr
- Romanian embassy protest on Flickr
- Protests of September on Mediafax ZOOM

Video
- Roșia Montană protest – CLASHES between protesters and gendarmes on YouTube
- Roșia Montană protests, day 15/Bucharest, 15 September 2013 on YouTube
- #roșiamontană, day 8 – The great march on YouTube
- #roșiamontană, day 10 – The concert on YouTube
- #roșiamontană, day 21 – Human chain around the Palace of the Parliament on YouTube
- #roșiamontană, day 22 – March to Iancului-Pantelimon on YouTube
- United We Save – leaf in front of the Government on YouTube
- Great Gathering of Câmpeni, 19 October 2013 on YouTube

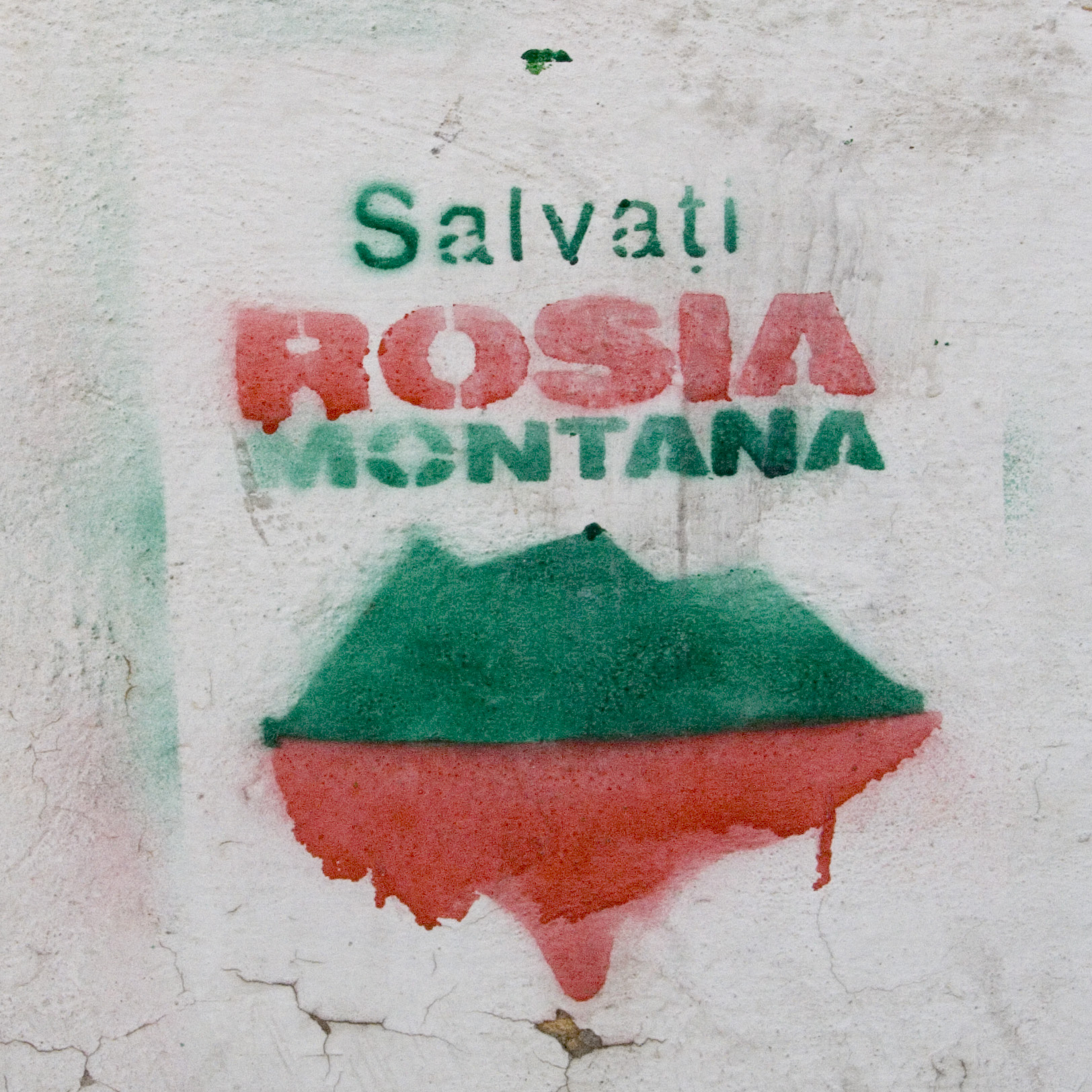
Save Roșia Montană (Romanian: Salvați Roșia Montană), logo used by protesters

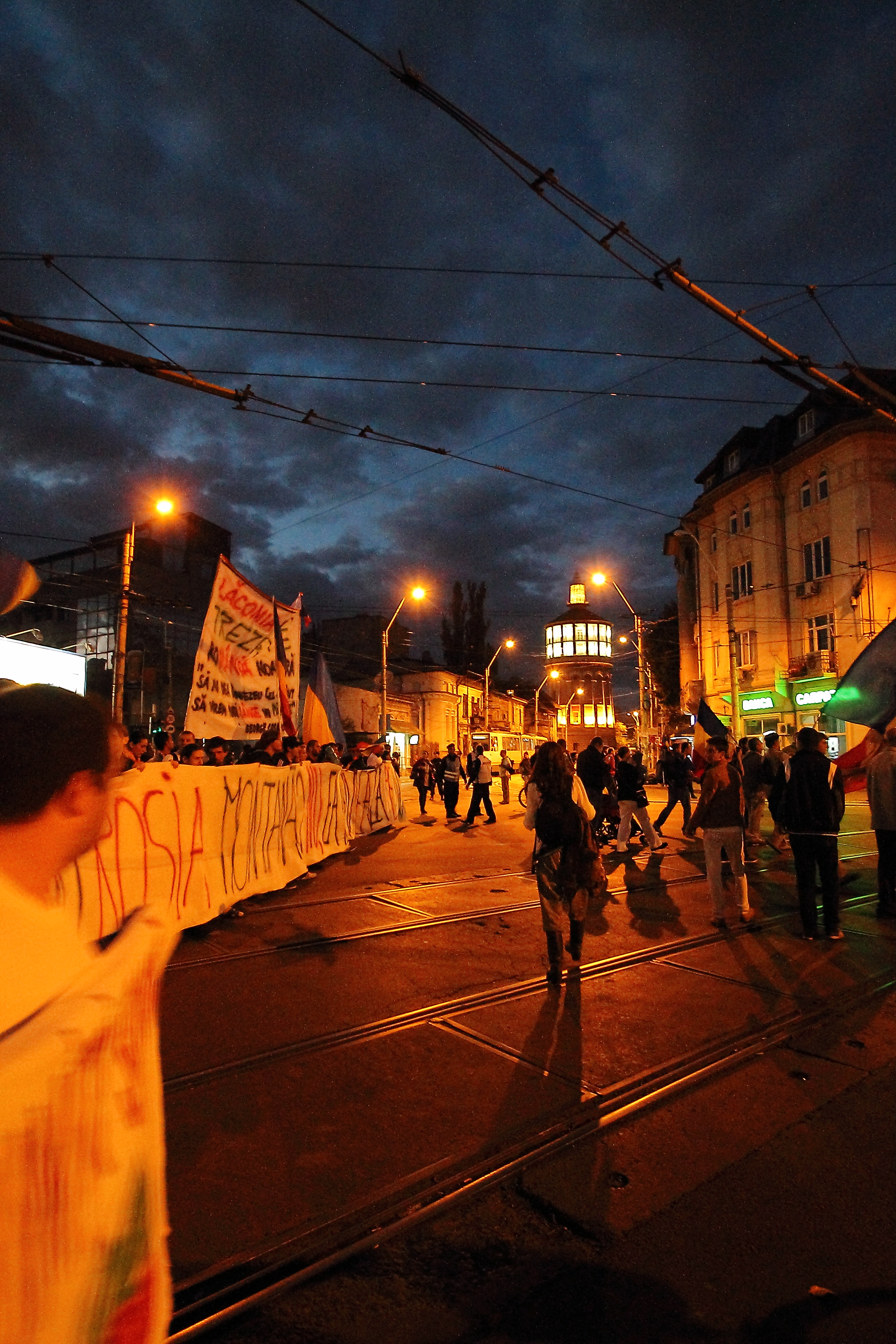
Protesters blocking a road near Foișorul de Foc, 22 September

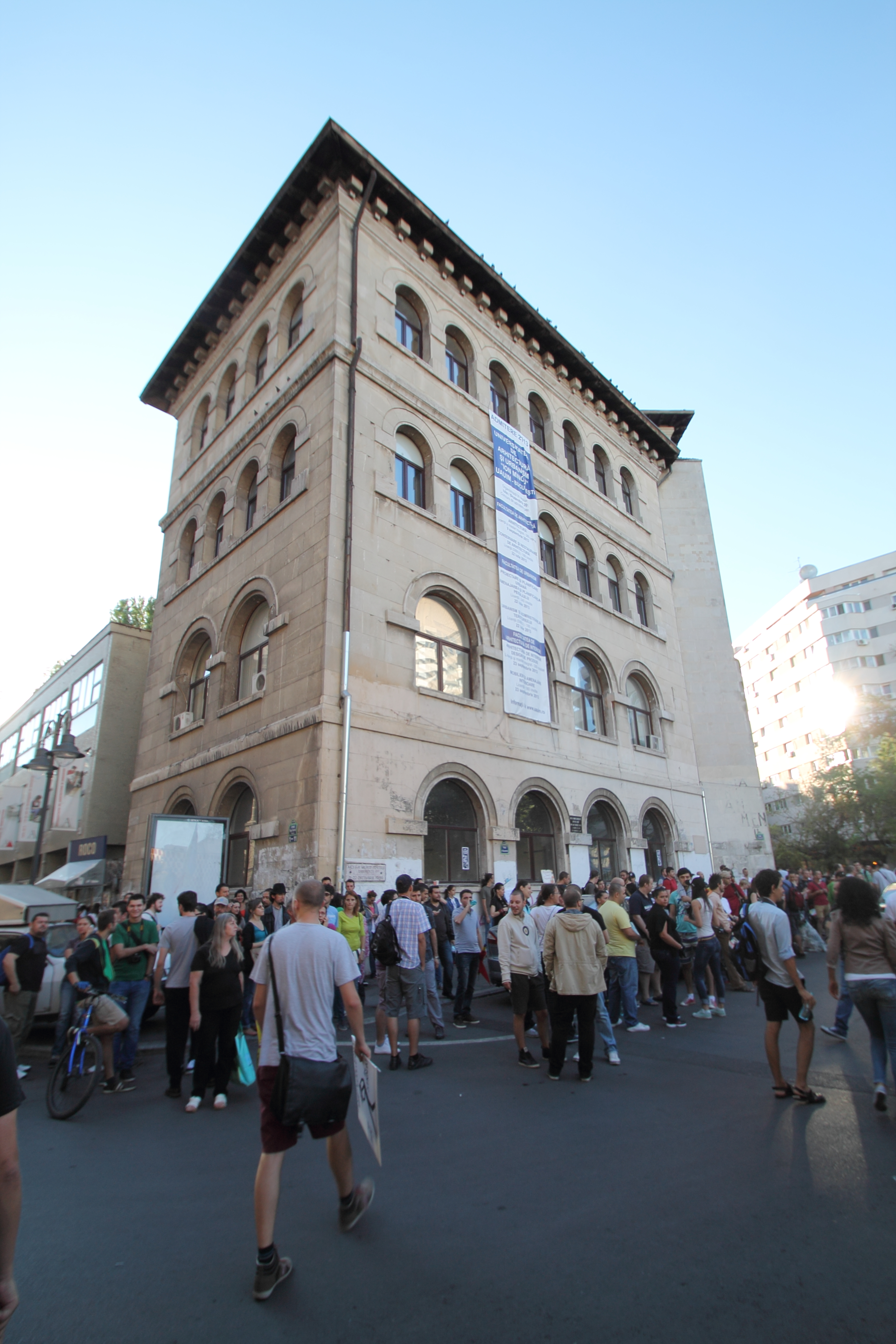
Demonstrants near the Ion Mincu University, 15 September

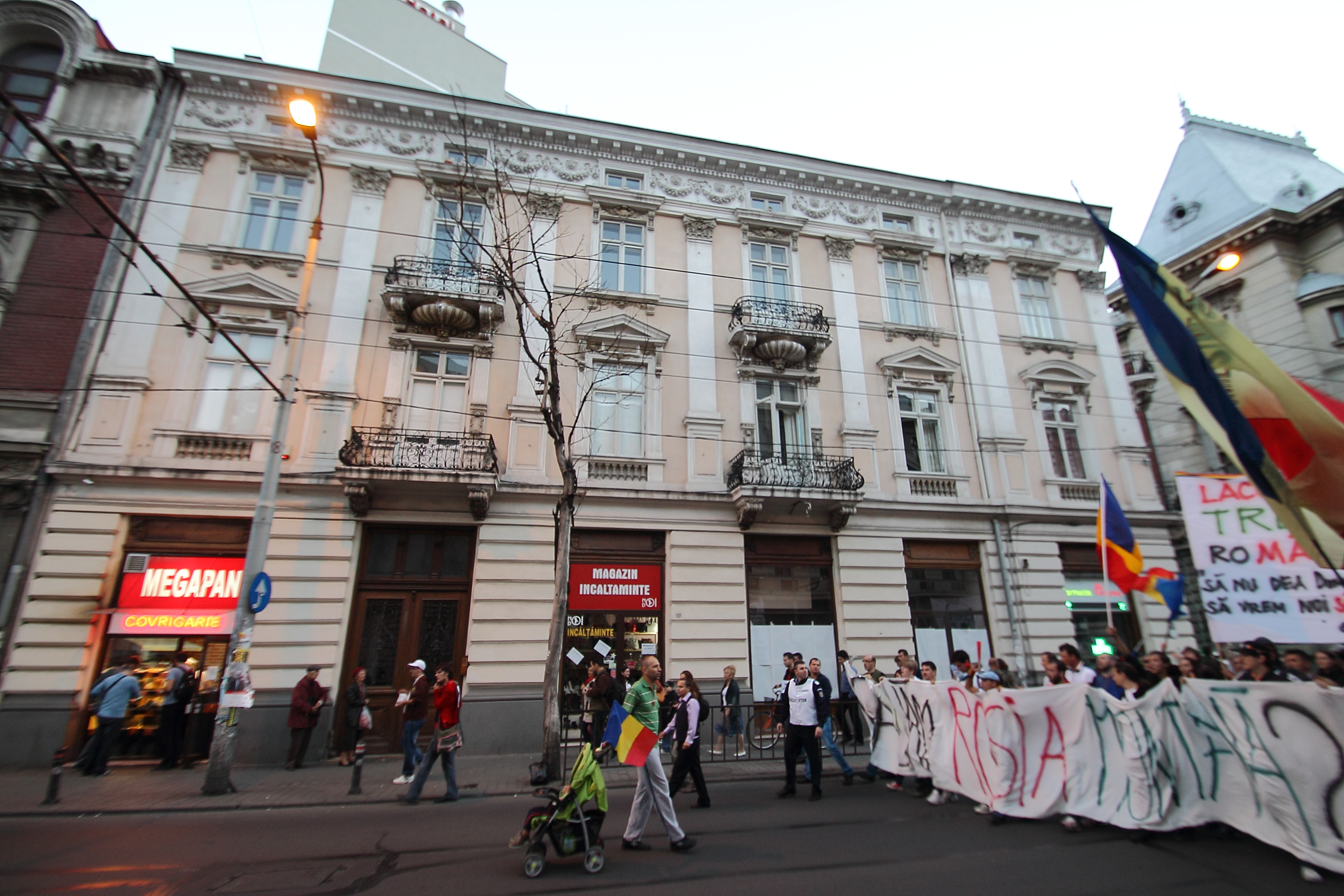
Protesters marching on Carol Boulevard, 22 September

Protesters accused the Romanian media of a media blackout, claiming that this was due to the fact that Gabriel Resources paid large sums of money in advertising throughout the years. According to Forbes Romania, Roșia Montană Gold Corporation paid 5.4 million €-worth (rate card prices) of advertising in the Romanian newspapers during the last three years and about €550,000 in TV ads last year.

On 7 September, thousands of protesters marched to the publicly funded Romanian Television (TVR) headquarters to protest against the TVR's blackout, but this protest was not featured in its news program, either.

With the exception of the national television channel Digi24, the first week of protests went uncovered in almost all mainstream mass-media, which led to a strong negative reaction in the protesters.

As the protests became larger, it became impossible for the media to ignore the events. Still, the press was continuously criticised of presenting the news in a biased or distorted manner, in ways such as grossly minimising the activists' number to suggest the existence of a minor revolt or making use of TV personalities such as the popular media figure Mircea Badea to present the protesters as a mass of disoriented people with no defined purpose.

Some media outlets accused the protesters and environmentalists of financial gains. For instance, TV show host Mihai Gâdea of Antena 3 (Romania) accused Horia-Roman Patapievici of being a real estate speculator for owning land in Roșia Montană. Patapievici replied in an open letter that he owns only 1 square meter, as a symbol of solidarity with the people of Roșia Montană and that it is not a real estate investment. Evenimentul Zilei accused the "cunning NGO activists" involved in the protests of receiving money from foreigners (such as George Soros's Open Society Foundations) and using the money to organize the protests. Likewise, Mihai Gâdea has addressed, in one of his shows, an insulting message to opposers of the Roșia Montană Project in University Square. He called protesters "Băsescu's slaves", adding that "many of you don't know because of ketamine, high ketamine impedes you understanding things." He later defended himself, arguing that he did not insult all the protesters. More than that, both Mihai Gâdea and Mircea Badea were threatened on Facebook by angry protesters.

The protesters chanted against what they perceived as the corruption of press. Evenimentul Zilei claimed that this is part of a "campaign of disinformation" which intends to "discredit the mainstream media".

== Concessions ==
President Băsescu mentioned the possibility of having a national referendum regarding the Roșia Montană project, but later on he clarified that it is just a possibility, not that he's starting a referendum. On 16 September, President Traian Băsescu asked Prime-Minister Ponta to withdraw the law from the Parliament, arguing that it has clauses that breach the constitution and predicting that, if it passes, it would be rejected by the Constitutional Court of Romania.

On 9 September, Prime-Minister Victor Ponta predicted that the Romanian Parliament would reject the law and that the government would try to find other ways to increase jobs for that area. This news led to a fall of 48% of the shares of Gabriel Resources on the Toronto stock exchange and threats from the company to sue the Romanian state for damages of $4 billion if the law does not pass the Parliament.

Nevertheless, PM Ponta changed his mind the following weeks, at first arguing that not doing the project "would not be a big loss for Romania" and a week later that it "would be a negative signal to foreign investors" and hence, "a catastrophe for Romania".

Crin Antonescu, the leader of the National Liberal Party, announced that his party opposes the project.

On 19 November, the Senate rejected the bill on Roșia Montană, in the form submitted by the Government. The Senate adopted with 119 votes "for", three votes "against" and six abstentions, the Report elaborated by the Special Parliamentary Commission on Roșia Montană Project, that proposed the rejection of the bill as passed by the Government. The commission recommended a new draft law for all mining in the area.

== Reactions ==
Former Minister of Culture Răzvan Theodorescu claimed that the protests are "a dangerous beginning" and that the counterculture is dangerous for Romania because the protesters oppose all parties, which he argues to be "the representatives of the Romanian people". Former President Ion Iliescu dismissed the protesters as people "don't know a great deal" about the project and that they're acting like "19th century poets horrified by industry".

Historian Vladimir Tismăneanu applauded the protests, arguing that "civic mobilization can stop government actions that are dangerous for the society" and that "the spirit of 1990 University Square is back".

On 4 September, Crown Princess Margareta of Romania transmitted, through a communique, the position of the royal family to the Roșia Montană Project. Royal House of Romania, alongside the Romanian Academy, the Catholic and Orthodox churches and the civil society, supports, in every way possible, safeguarding and flowering virtues and values of Roșia Montană, opposing the destruction of nature through gold cyanidation.

Victoria Stoiciu, then an analyst at the Friedrich Ebert Foundation, opined that these protests were "an unprecedented phenomenon since the 1990s", breaking the "suffocating civic apathy in Romania".

Adrian Sobaru, Romanian Television employee who in 2010 jumped from the balcony of the Chamber of Deputies in protest against austerity measures promoted by Emil Boc Government, decided, on 10 September, during his child's birthday, to go on hunger strike. He calls for depoliticization of public television, public radio and other important state institutions, solutions for Roșia Montană problem and compliance with all promises made by USL leadership during the electoral campaign. MediaSind Romanian Federation of Journalists solidarized with protests triggered by Adrian Sobaru and will inform the European Federation of Journalists, the International Federation of Journalists, the European Parliament and the European Commission about the manner in which Ponta Government will address the issues raised by Adrian Sobaru.

In a press conference, President of the Senate, Crin Antonescu, said that the Roșia Montană Project can not be sustained, considering also that the contrary public sentiment is more important than technical data. Likewise, the mayor of Cluj-Napoca, also former premier, Emil Boc, said on 4 September, in a press conference, that calls on the Government to withdraw the law on RMP, because is unconstitutional. Boc argues that it offers to a private company public powers that must belong only to the Government or public authorities. The same opinion was adopted by President Traian Băsescu, who also expressed his desire to pass responsibility for the project to state agencies. Liberal MEP Renate Weber said that she's ready to represent the Romanian State in a possible trial with Roșia Montană Gold Corporation, arguing that the company is one of the type "hit and run".

On 24 September, Mihăiță Calimente, the head of the Foreign Intelligence Service Parliamentary Commission, claimed that ONGs financed by Soros acted like a catalyzer in the protests and that they can be "a danger for national security".

Greenpeace Romania announced on its official page that over 13,000 people ask lawmakers not to approve the "disastrous" bill for Roșia Montană.

According to Oxford Analytica, the protests have plunged the government into disarray and may bring it down.

=== Involvement of the Romanian Intelligence Service ===
The Director of the Romanian Intelligence Service, George Maior and the Director of the Foreign Intelligence Service, Teodor Meleșcanu, were heard, on 30 September, by the parliamentary oversight commission on the subject of Roșia Montană.

George Maior stated that the Roșia Montană Project is a matter of national security, warning that some "eco-anarchist structures" might attempt to hijack the legitimate protest movements on the issue. He stressed that the Service has submitted, during 1999–2013, 500 informative notices on this topic, emphasizing that the institution he leads can not rule on whether the project will be implemented.

On the same day, the Delegate Minister for Infrastructure Projects of National Interest and Foreign Investment, Dan Șova, was heard saying that the operating license for the Roșia Montană mining activities was granted to RMGC at the request of Canadian banks and the stock exchange. Șova also said that the Romanian state would be obliged to give approval to RMGC to start mining operations at Roșia Montană, otherwise the company would appeal to the International Court of Arbitration.

=== Protests in favor of the mining project ===
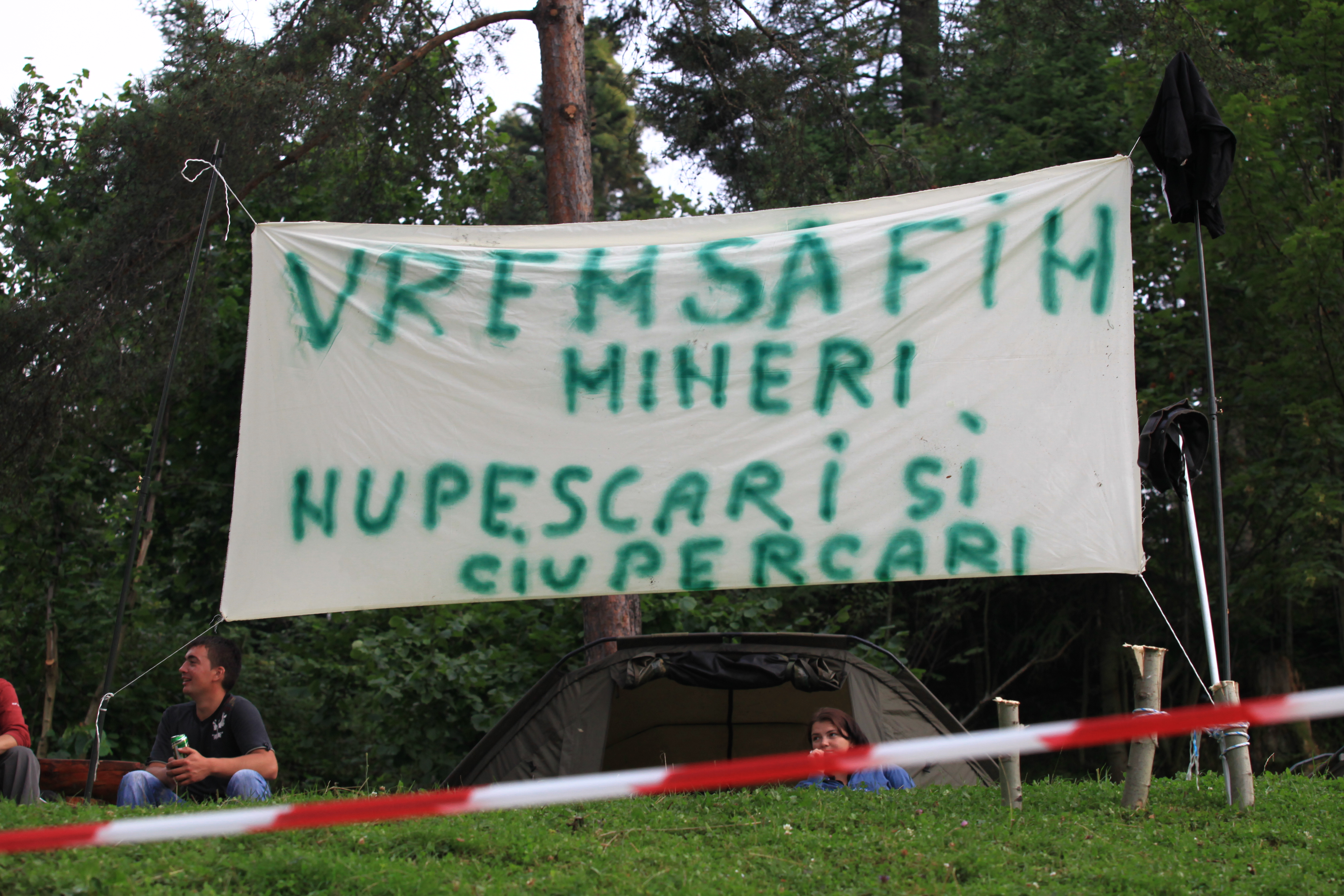
Some of the residents of Roșia Montană support the mining project.

Protests in favor of the mining project took place in Roșia Montană and surrounding localities, but at a lesser scale, their number not surpassing a few hundreds. They were largely orchestrated by RMGC themselves with the support of local administrations. 33 workers had blocked themselves into the Roșia Montană museum shafts 300 metres below ground and threatened to go on hunger strike over fears jobs would be lost if the mining plans did not go ahead. They demanded the presence of Prime Minister Victor Ponta and PNL leader Crin Antonescu. On 15 September, the Prime Minister descended into the underground to discuss with the protesters, resulting in the end of their strike.

Ion Cristoiu, in an op-ed in Evenimentul Zilei, argued that Ponta's descent to the mine was a "disgusting show", reminding of Nicolae Ceaușescu's propaganda and that Victor Ponta was simply an actor in a Roșia Montană Gold Corporation ad.

With the occasion of Miner's Day, 50 mayors in the Apuseni Mountains have sent to governors and lawmakers a call asking them to allow commencement of gold mining project in the village.

On 25 September, independent MP Remus Cernea and two other German environmentalists went to Roșia Montană to dialogue with supporters and opponents of the mining project. The three were aggressed by angry mobs. They were evacuated by police as they would have risked being lynched by residents and supporters of the project. Remus Cernea was trying to take part in discussions between the Parliamentary Commission and the syndicalists in the area.

In an interview accorded to Pro TV, a Romanian television program, President Traian Băsescu said that the protest at Roșia Montană, pro-RMGC, is forged. The Head of State also said that he doesn't like "to pretend that we enter into tourist galleries and say that we are the underground miners".

== See also ==
- 2012–13 Romanian protests against shale gas
- List of protests in the 21st century
