= Stéphanie Danielle Roth =

French-Swiss activist (born 1970)

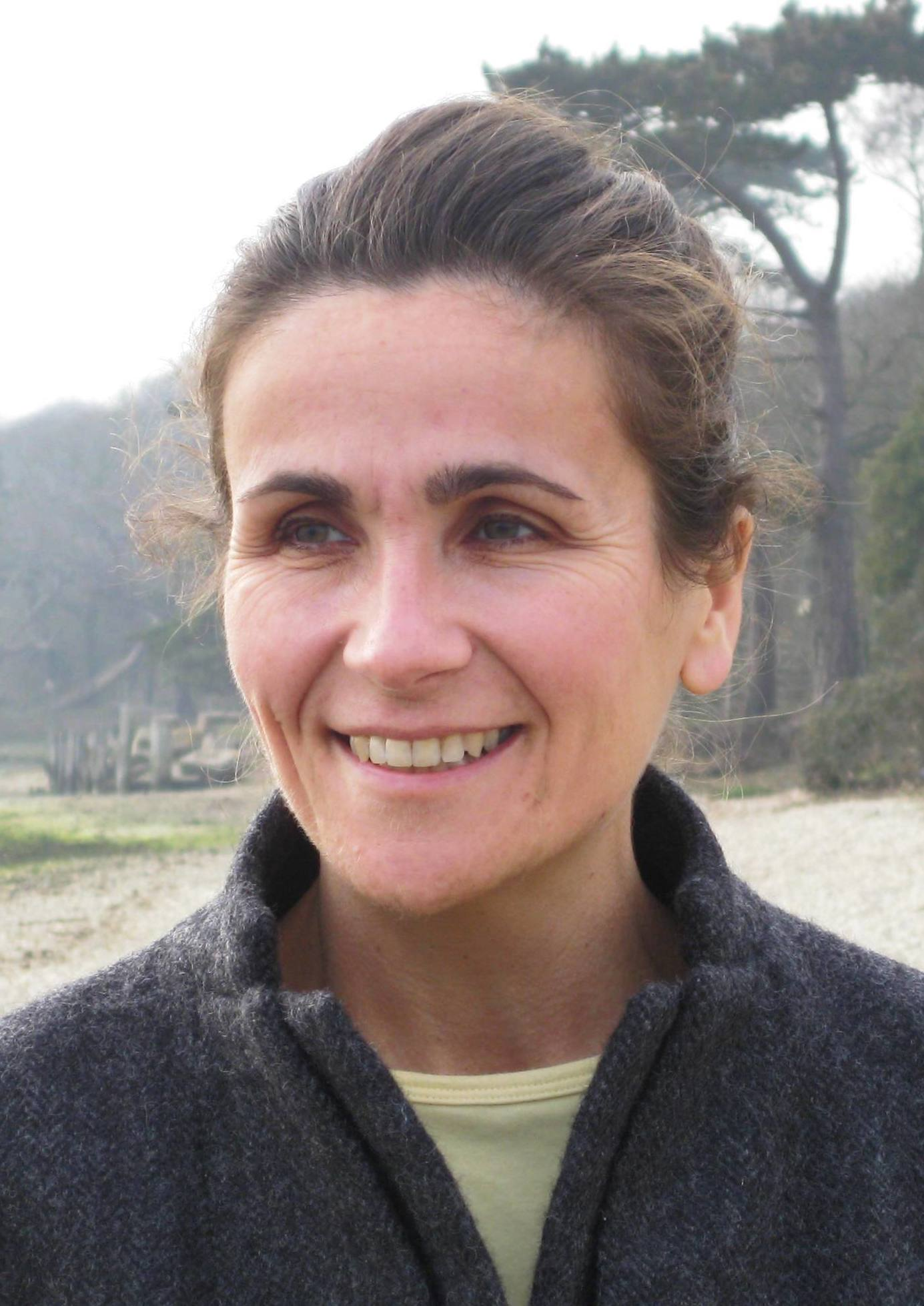
- Born: 1970 (age 55–56)
- Awards: Goldman Environmental Prize (2005)

Stéphanie Danielle Roth is a French-Swiss environmental campaigner working on environmental, heritage and social issues with a focus on mining and farming.

== Biography ==
Stéphanie Danielle Roth was born in 1970 and has both French and Swiss nationality. After completing an MPhil in IR at Cambridge, Roth became the research assistant of Teddy or Edward Goldsmith, the renowned ecologist and founder of The Ecologist magazine. Goldsmith's writings and views were to have a main influence on Roth's work. In 1999 she became an editor of The Ecologist magazine which was then run by Zac Goldsmith. While working there, Roth specialised on campaigns and social movements, regularly contributing with articles on a wide range of issues. In 2002 she moved to Romania to volunteer with grassroots groups working against destructive developments. Roth first worked with the Sighisoara Durabila NGO against a Dracula theme park planned in a natural reservation area situated in close vicinity to the UNESCO protected city of Sighisoara. Once the theme park was halted in May 2002, she moved to Rosia Montana to help develop a campaign against Europe's largest open-pit gold mine proposed by Rosia Montana Gold Corporation. This campaign, which Roth coordinated from 2002 to 2010, is known as the Save Rosia Montana movement and centres around the local opposition. In 2005 she received the Goldman Environmental Prize for her efforts to stop this development.

In 2008, Roth initiated a Romanian NGO platform to ban the use of cyanide in mining. The campaign spilled over to Hungary and provoked a ban of cyanide-based mining at the 10th anniversary year of the Baia Mare cyanide accident. This precedent setting vote led to the formation of an informal platform consisting of CEE and CIS-based NGOs campaigning for an EU-wide ban on cyanide based mining. In May 2010 the European Parliament overwhelmingly voted for such ban but to this day the European Commission for the Environment refuses to act on it; quoting unemployment generated by such ban. In 2011 Roth initiated a campaign for Rosia Montana to become a UNESCO protected World Heritage site. Over the years Roth has contributed to the work of several mining and related campaigns and assessments in the CEE region and beyond. Roth currently lives in Berlin where she developed campaigns for ARC2020, a European platform working on food & farming issues and the CAP reform. Since 2014 she has been working as campaign coordinator of the Stop TTIP self-organized European citizen's initiative, a European campaign fighting against the TTIP and CETA transatlantic free trade agreements. To this date Roth is still contributing to the 'Save Rosia Montana!' campaign.
