= Roșia Montană =

- Commune
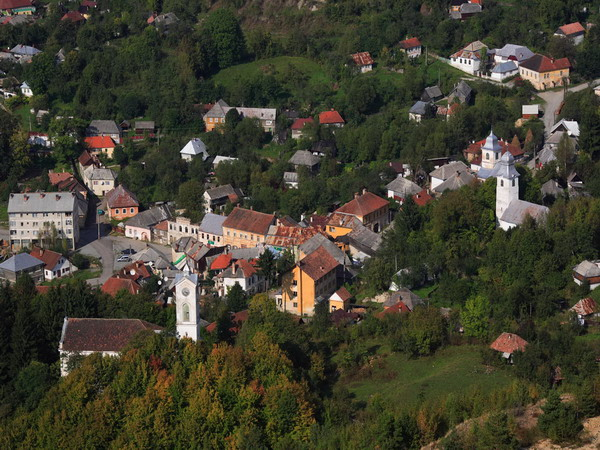
- Roșia Montană, 2007

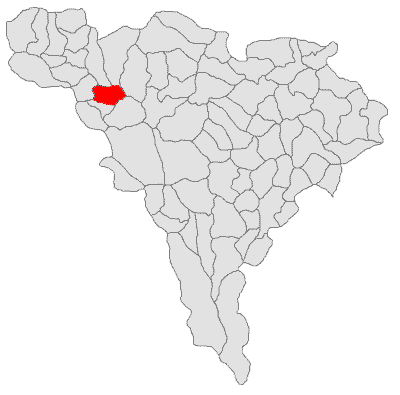
- Location in Alba County

- Location in Romania
- Coordinates: 46°18′22″N 23°07′49″E
- Country: Romania
- County: Alba
- Established: 131 (first reference)

Government
  - Mayor (2024–2028): Eugen Funduli (PNL)
- Area: 42 km^{2} (16 sq mi)
- Elevation: 850 m (2,790 ft)
- Population (2021-12-01): 2,428
  - Density: 58/km^{2} (150/sq mi)
- Time zone: UTC+02:00 (EET)
  - Summer (DST): UTC+03:00 (EEST)
- Postal code: 517615
- Area code: (+40) 02 58
- Vehicle reg.: AB
- Website: primariarosiamontana.ro

UNESCO World Heritage Site
- Official name: Roșia Montană Mining Landscape
- Type: Cultural
- Criteria: (ii) (iii) (iv)
- Designated: 2021 (44th session)
- Reference no.: 1552
- Endangered: 2021–present

Roșia Montană (Romanian pronunciation: [ˈroʃi.a monˈtanə], "Roșia of the Mountains"; Latin: Alburnus Maior; Hungarian: Verespatak, [ˈvɛrɛʃpɒtɒk]; German: Goldbach, Rotseifen) is a commune of Alba County in the Apuseni Mountains of western Transylvania, Romania. It is located in the Valea Roșiei, through which the small river Roșia Montană flows. The commune is composed of sixteen villages: Bălmoșești, Blidești, Bunta, Cărpiniș (Abrudkerpenyes), Coasta Henții, Corna (Szarvaspatak), Curături, Dăroaia, Gârda-Bărbulești, Gura Roșiei (Verespataktorka), Iacobești, Ignățești, Roșia Montană, Șoal, Țarina, and Vârtop (Vartop).

The rich mineral resources of the area have been exploited since Roman times or before. The state-run gold mine closed in late 2006 in advance of Romania's accession to the European Union. Gabriel Resources of Canada plan to open a new mine. This has caused controversy on one hand over the extent to which remains of Roman mining would be preserved and over fears of a repeat of the cyanide pollution at Baia Mare and on the other, over the benefits that mining would bring to this poor and underdeveloped part of the country.

The campaign against mining at Roșia Montană was one of the largest protest campaigns in the last 20 years in Romania. A plethora of organizations spoke out against the project, from Greenpeace to the Romanian Academy. After a series of nationwide protests in the autumn of 2013, the Chamber of Deputies eventually rejected the project on 3 June 2014. Moreover, Roșia Montană has been classified as a historic site of national importance, by an order of the Ministry of Culture issued on 30 December 2015. Thus, industrial activity is prohibited in the area.

== History ==
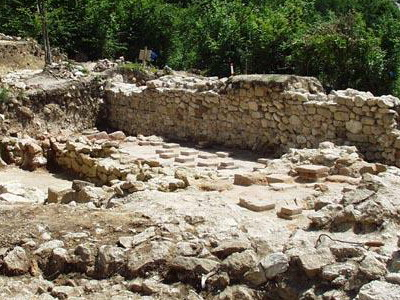
Ruins of Alburnus Maior in Roșia Montană

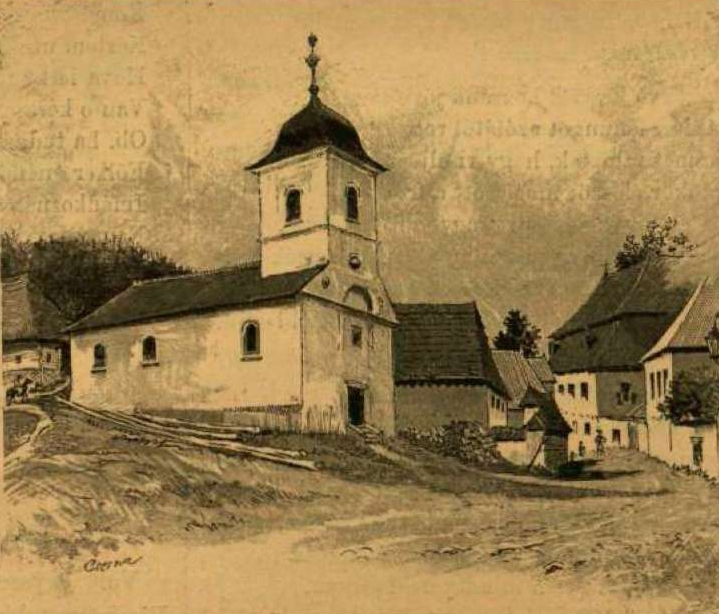
Roșia Montană in 1890

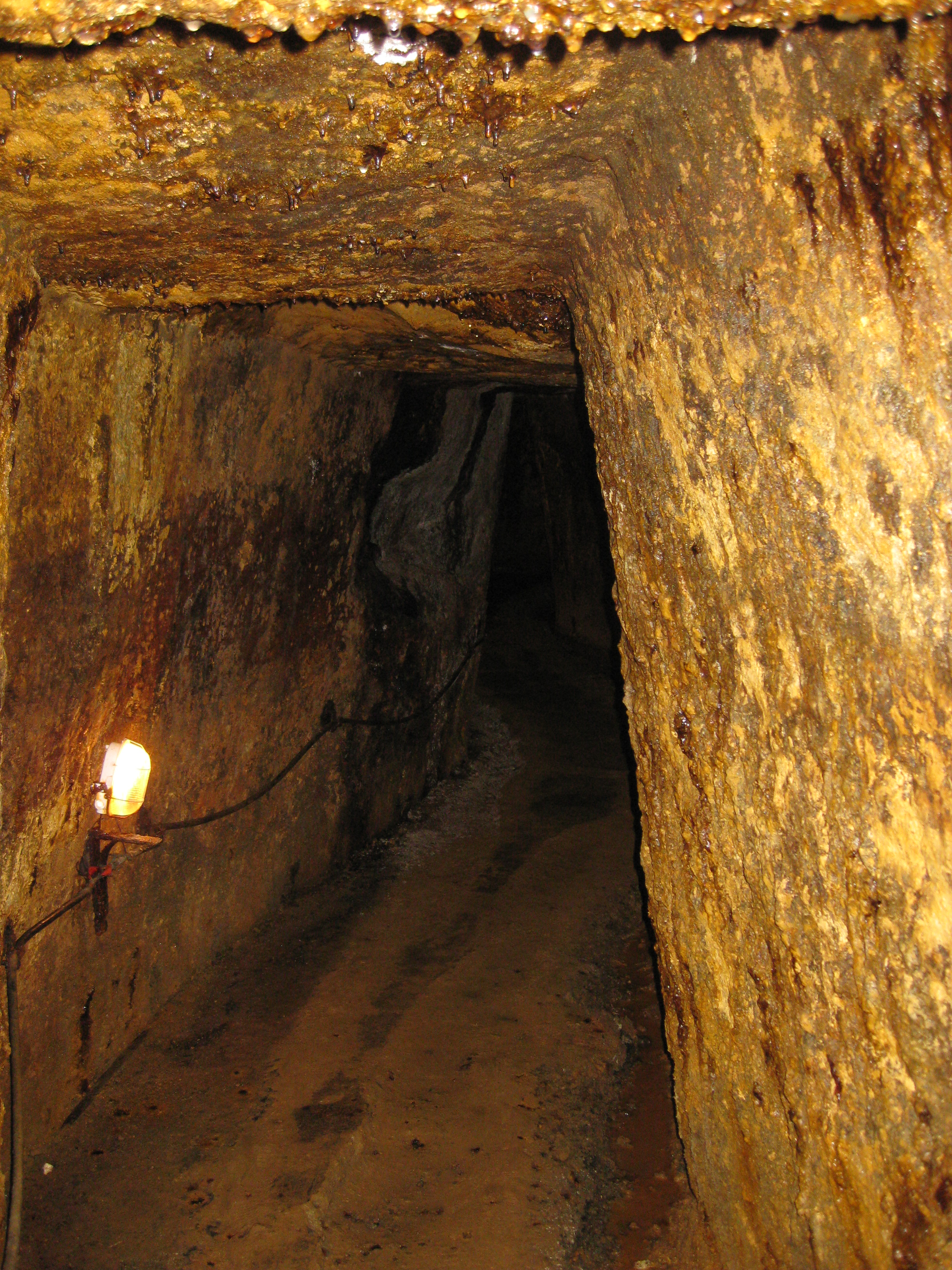
Roșia Montană has one of the most extensive networks of Roman gold mines.

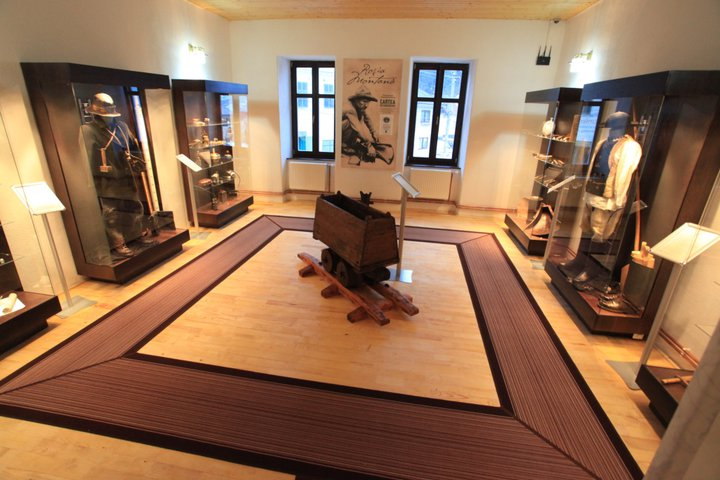
Museum of Gold Mining

There is archaeological and metallurgical evidence of gold mining in the 'Golden Quadrilateral' of Transylvania since the late Stone Age. The community, then known as Alburnus Maior, was founded by the Romans during the rule of Trajan as a mining town, with Illyrian colonists from South Dalmatia. The earliest reference to the town is on a wax tablet dated 6 February 131. Archaeologists have discovered in the town ancient dwellings, necropolises, mine galleries, mining tools, 25 wax tablets and many inscriptions in Greek and Latin, centred around Carpeni Hill. The Romans left Dacia in 271.

Mining appears to have started again in the Middle Ages by German (Transylvanian Saxon) migrants using similar techniques to the Romans. This continued until the devastating wars of the mid-16th century.

Mining was much expanded under the Austrian Empire with the encouragement of the Imperial authorities. Charles VI funded the construction of ponds (tăuri) in 1733. After the empire broke up in 1918, most of the remaining veins were mined out under fixed-length concessions granted to local citizens. The sulphide-rich waste generated large volumes of sulphuric acid (a phenomenon known as acid mine drainage) which in turn liberated heavy metals into local water sources, in addition to the mercury used to extract the gold.

In 1948 the mines were taken over by the Romanian state, with traditional small scale underground mining continuing until the late 1960s. Attention then turned to the lower-grade gold disseminated through the rock surrounding the veins. In 1975 an open-cast pit was constructed at Cetate for bulk mining. This mine was operated by Roșiamin, a subsidiary of the state-owned company Regia Autonomă a Cuprului din Deva (RAC), and provided 775 jobs, representing most of the employment in the region. The ore was flotation-concentrated at Gura Roșiei and then extracted by cyanide leaching at Baia de Arieș. This mine needed subsidies of US$3 million per year in 2004 and was closed in 2006 before Romania joined the European Union.

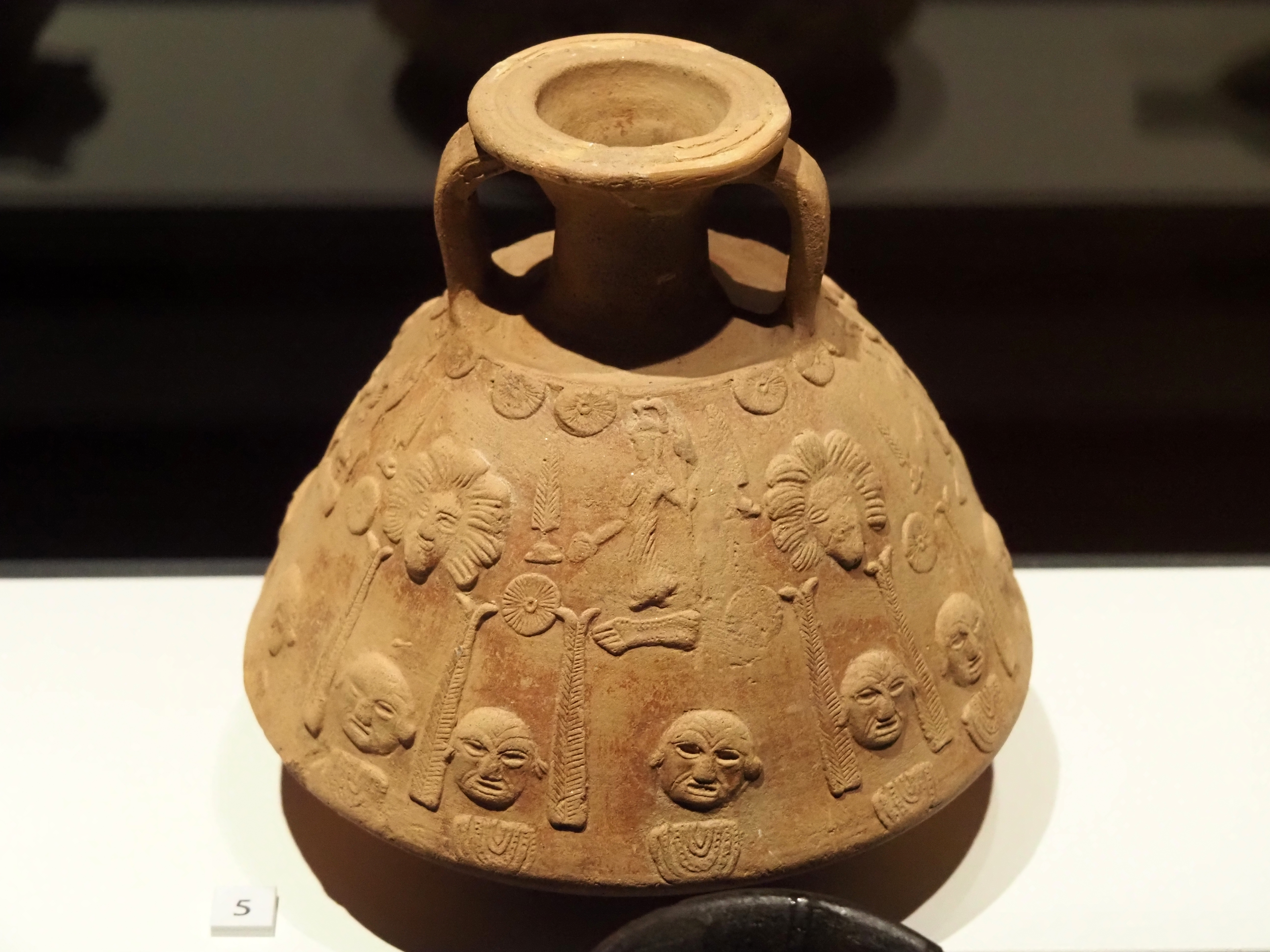
Jug, found in Alburnus Maior - Roman necropolis of Tăul Secuilor / Pârâul Porcului, tomb M. 112 (Roșia Montană, Alba county, Romania), 2nd century AD, Bucharest, National Museum of Romanian History (Inv. 334369).

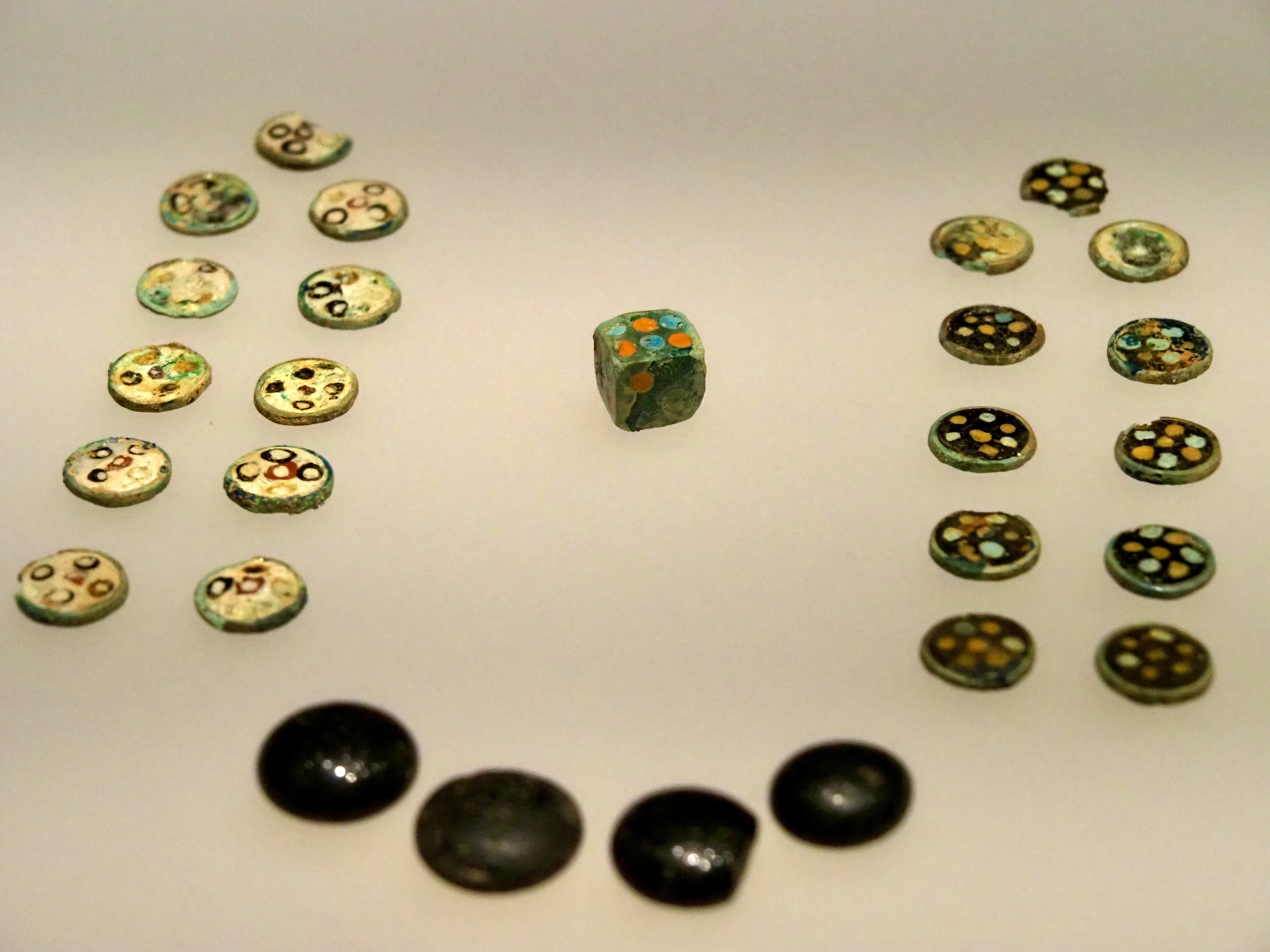
Game pieces, from Alburnus Maior - Roman necropolis Pârâul Porcului-Tăul Secuilor, tomb M.6 (Roșia Montană, Alba county, Romania), 2nd century AD, Bucharest, National Museum of Romanian History (Inv. 382084-382114).

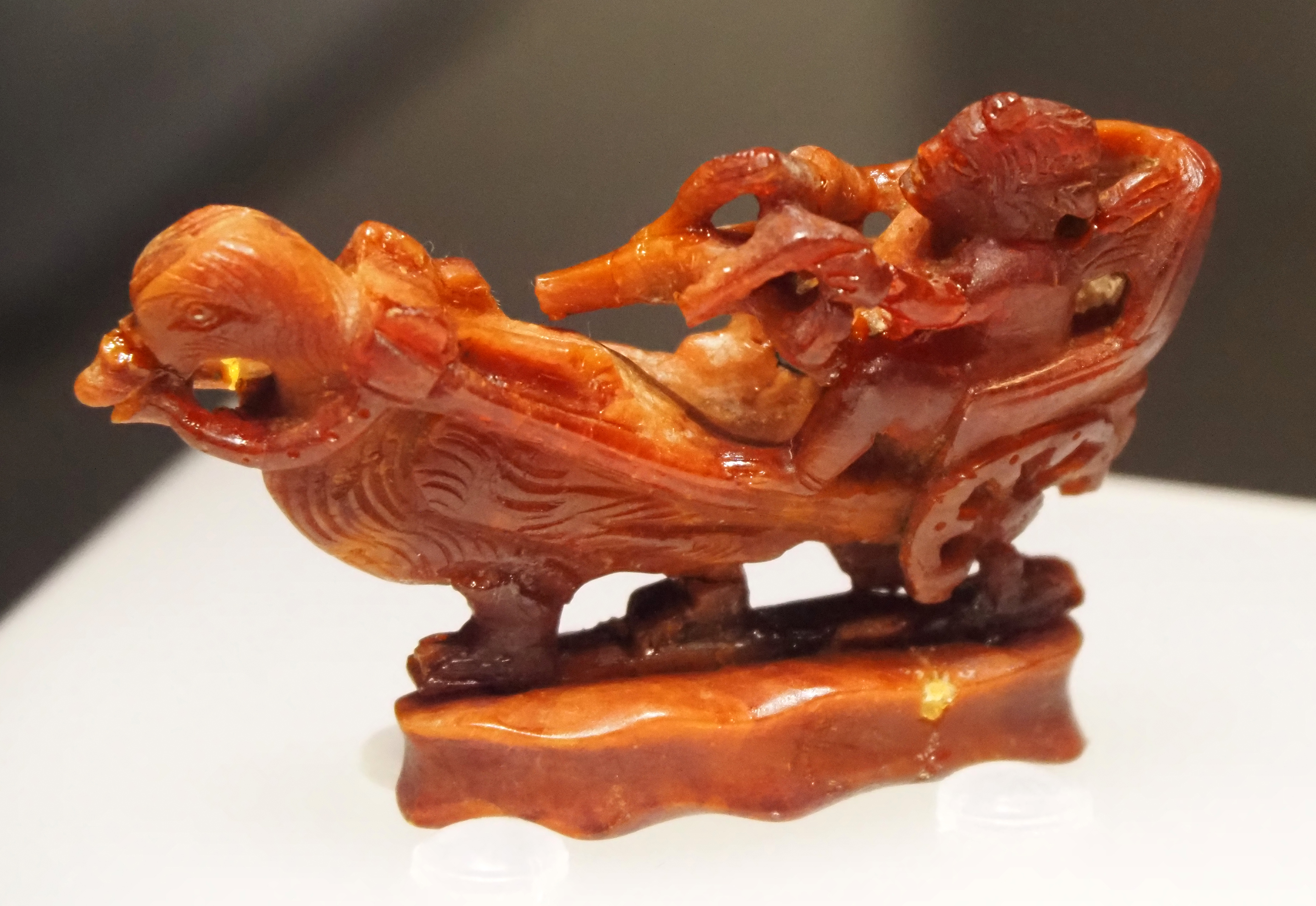
Amber figurine, one of the few extant creations of the “Master of the Aquileia Eros”, an anonymous artist. Discovered in Alburnus Maior - Necropolis of Pârâul Porcului / Tăul Secuilor (Roșia Montană, Alba county, Romania), 1st - 2nd century AD, Bucharest, National Museum of Romanian History (Inv. 358809).

== Mining project ==
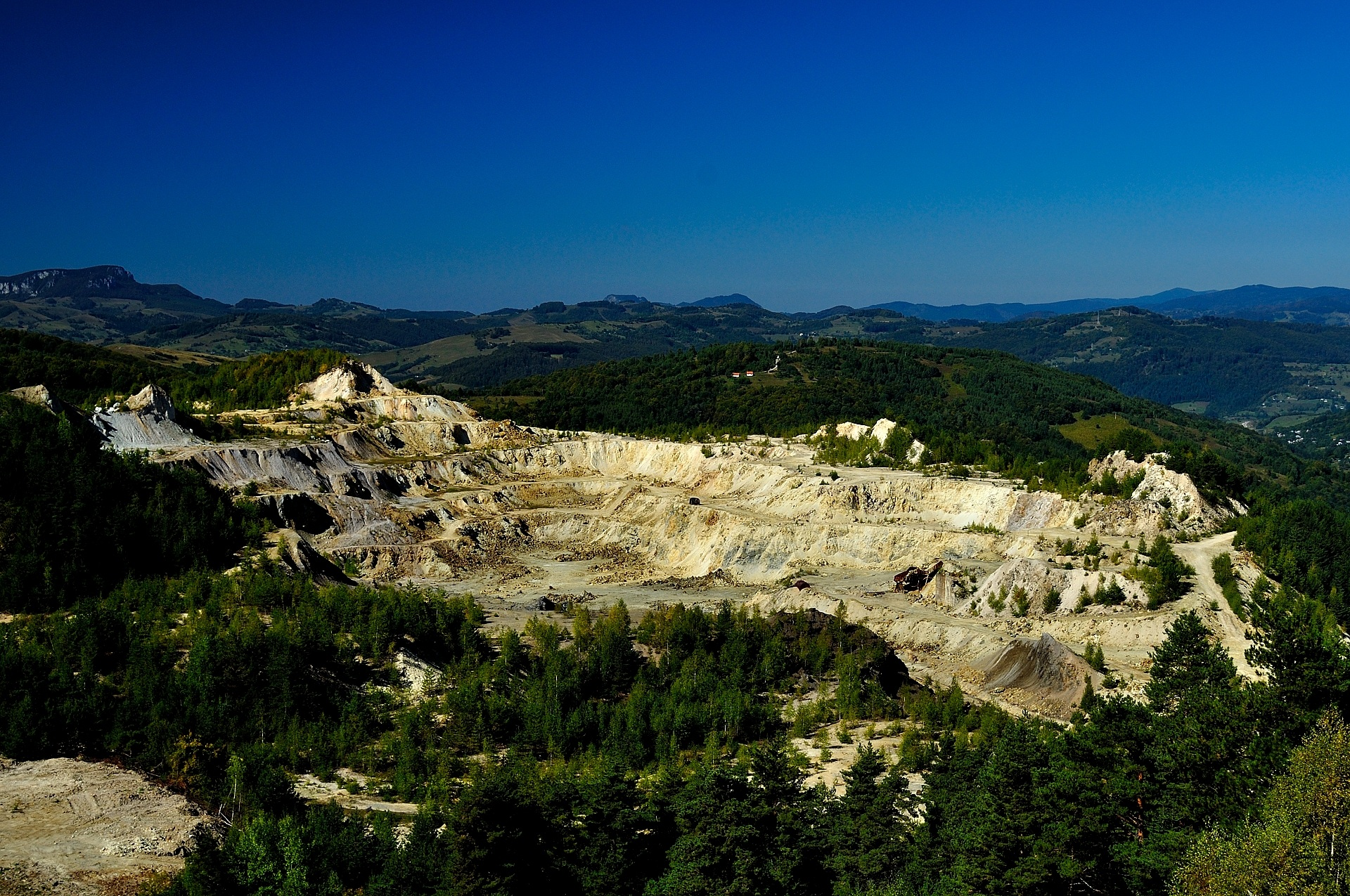
Cetate open-pit gold mine (1971–2006) near Roșia Montană

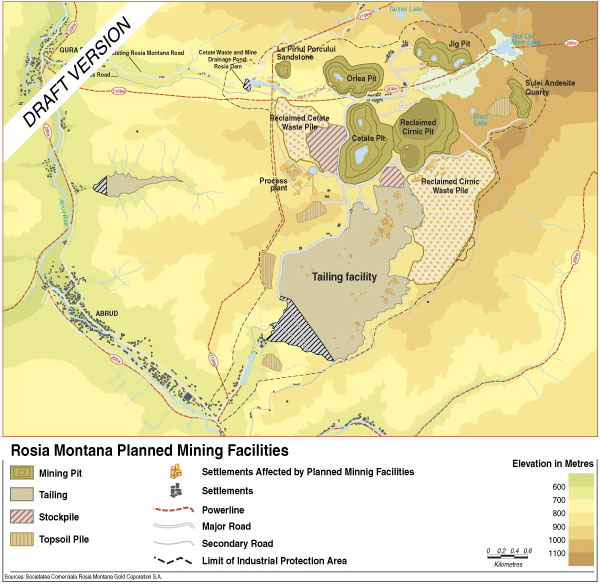
Roșia Montană planned mining facilities

The Project's origins are in a 1995 deal signed by RAC Deva with the controversial Romanian-Australian businessman Frank Timiș about reprocessing the tailings at Roșia Montană. Several years later, the mining licence for an area of 23.8823 km^{2} (9.2210 sq mi) around Roșia Montană was transferred to the Roșia Montană Gold Corporation (RMGC) from Minvest Deva SA (successor to RAC Deva). RMGC is owned 80% by Toronto-listed company Gabriel Resources, 19.3% by the Romanian government via Minvest.

Within the project, Roșia Montană Gold Corporation (RMGC) plans to produce 225 tonnes of gold and 819 tonnes of silver over 17 years and it would involve digging up a large area, involving the creation of four mining pits covering 205 ha (510 acres), the first two at the old mining sites of Cirnic and Cetate, followed by pits at Jig and Orlea in Phase II. Up to 250 million tonnes of cyanide-laced tailings will be stored in a 363 ha (900 acres) pond in the Corna Valley behind a 185m-high dam.

The corporation was not able to gain full authorization for the project. State authorities granted permits which were later annulled by the courts following appeals by environmental groups. The environmental impact assessment procedure started in 2004, but a final approval was still in the process of being given.

The company began buying up houses in the city, but about 100 residents refused to sell and, supported by environmentalists, architects, archeologists and lawyers, they have been battling the corporation and the state in courts. The main concerns of the opponents are related to environmental dangers of cyanide leaching of gold (as Romania witnessed the 2000 Baia Mare cyanide spill), as well as the destruction of the ancient Roman sites in Roșia Montană.

Resistance to RMGC's plans followed a Romanian Academy report on the project released in April 2003, which recommended that all cyanide mining be suspended in Roșia Montană. In the following years, the Romanian Orthodox Church, the Romanian Catholic Church and the Romanian Unitarian Church have all signalled their opposition to the project. Large NGOs such as Greenpeace and political organisations such as the European Federation of Green Parties are also opposed.

In August 2005, the Canadian government announced that it supports Gabriel Resources' project; in October 2005, Miklós Persányi the Hungarian Minister of Environment announced that the Hungarian government strongly opposes the project. The Hungarian Historic Churches are particularly concerned about the threat to monuments and churches that are part of the common Hungarian cultural heritage.

In 2013, the Victor Ponta government announced that it will send through parliament a new law that would allow the bypass of environmental and heritage regulations that prevented the project from being started. This led to the 2013 Romanian protests against the Roșia Montană Project in major cities across the country.

In November 2013 the senate rejected a draft law which would have paved the way for the mining project to go ahead. Previously, a parliamentary Special Commission concluded that the wording of the draft law was inadequate and recommended that a new law be introduced for the implementation of large scale mining projects across Romania. Amid speculation that the rejection of the draft law could mean the end of the mining project, Gabriel have said that it is 'a first step in defining the next phase of developing Roșia Montană'.

== FânFest festival ==
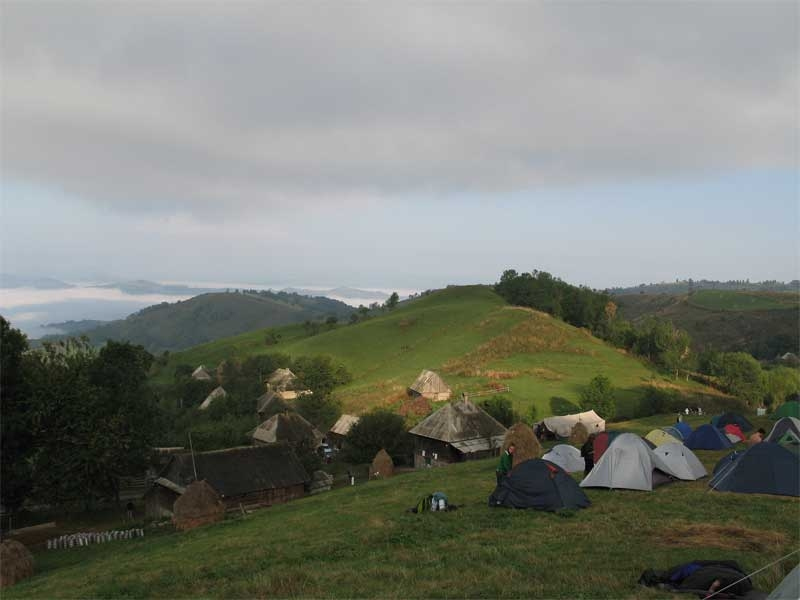
Tourists' tents alongside locals houses in Roșia Montană during the FânFest in 2007

In Roșia Montană, each year since 2004, in August, several NGOs have organized a free music festival in aid of the Save Roșia Montană campaign. "FânFest" (Fân means "hay" in Romanian) has featured many big Romanian bands and singers, such as Ada Milea, Luna Amară, Shukar Collective, Timpuri Noi, Sarmalele Reci, Vița de Vie and, from the Republic of Moldova, Zdob și Zdub. All artists perform pro bono in aid of the campaign and to celebrate artistic diversity and multiculturalism.

The three-day FânFest event has a large range of cultural, environmental, musical and outdoor activities as well as offering the chance to participate in various workshops. The main stage features groups performing rock, jazz, folk, reggae and world music. The 2006 FânFest saw a second, "Alternative Activity", tent hosting theatre and dance performances, video projections and other cultural, environmental and social activities.

About 10,000 people attended the 2005 event and 15,000 in 2006.

== Demographics ==
Year	Total	Romanians	Hungarians	Roma	References
1850	5,756	4,651 (81%)	669	170	
1880	5,640	4,130 (73%)	1,452	—N/a	
1890	5,543	4,037 (73%)	1,472	—N/a	
1900	5,665	4,211 (74%)	1,424	—N/a	
1910	5,165	3,623 (70%)	1,515	—N/a	
1920	4,252	3,341 (79%)	880	—N/a	
1930	4,362	3,673 (84%)	609	60	
1941	5,409	4,557 (84%)	651	—N/a	
1956	4,169	3,684 (88%)	416	63	
1966	4,591	4,178 (91%)	317	87	
1977	4,393	4,060 (92%)	157	168	
1992	4,146	3,808 (92%)	104	228	
2002	3,872	3,518 (91%)	55	289	
2011	2,656	2,239 (84%)	6	334	
2021	2,428	1,798 (74%)	2	395	

== Natives ==
- Enea Hodoș (1858 – 1945), prose writer and folklorist

== See also ==
- Roșia Poieni copper mine
