= Gabriel Resources =

Canadian mining company

Gabriel Resources Limited
- Type: Public
- Traded as: TSX-V: GBU
- Industry: Mining
- Headquarters: London, England, Canada
- Number of locations: RMGS London, England
- Total equity: share price 0.01 CAD
- Number of employees: 500 (2008)
- Website: www.gabrielresources.com

Gabriel Resources Limited is a Canadian TSX-V-listed resource company focused on permitting and developing contested Roșia Montană gold and silver mine located in western central Romania. Rosia Montana is also home to ancient Roman mining galleries, which were added to UNESCO's World Heritage list in 2021.

The Project, the largest undeveloped gold deposit in Europe, is owned through Rosia Montana Gold Corporation S.A. (RMGC), a Romanian company in which Gabriel Resources holds an 80.69% stake and CNCAF Minvest S.A., a Romanian state-owned mining enterprise, the rest.

Gabriel is headquartered in the UK, listed in Canada and holds its Romanian assets through a Dutch company.

Since 2015, it has been in a dispute with the Romanian state at the World Bank's International Centre for Settlement of Investment Disputes for the failed mine project. According to its website, "the ICSID Arbitration has now become the core focus of the Company." On 8 March 2024, the Arbitration ruled in favor of Romania and ordered the company to pay Romania's legal costs.

Its share price is 0.01 CAD, as of 14 November 2024, a 97.44% collapse compared to the price one year ago.

== Romanian project ==
The history of the Rosia Montana mine site goes back at least to Emperor Trajan's time.

Rosia Montana is the largest undeveloped gold deposit in Europe, hosting measured and indicated resources of 10 million ounces of gold and 47.6 million ounces of silver, together with an inferred resource of 1.2 million ounces of gold. The project is estimated to produce 626,000 ounces of gold annually during its first five years of operation, with an estimated average of 500,000 ounces of gold and 1.79 million ounces of silver per year over its 16-year mine life.

The project is in an area which has been mined for many centuries and as recently as 2006 was subject to open pit mining by CNCAF Minvest. The project is subject to many protests. In September 2013, street protests took place in Bucharest, Cluj Napoca and other Romanian cities (see 2013 Romanian protests against the Roșia Montană Project). As a result, Gabriel shares dropped 64 percent (to a total of 41 percent drop this year).

== History ==
The company now known as Gabriel Resources was formed on 19 July 1986.

The Rosia Montana properties were transferred from the communist-governed state of Romania around its destruction in 1989 to a company controlled by Frank Timis, who brought his titles to Toronto, which was once the world's mining finance centre. Timis then bought an idle publicly listed Yukon company and renamed it Gabriel Resources, and into Gabriel transferred his titles.

Gabriel Resources was listed on the Toronto Stock Exchange in year 2000.

At some point in 2005, Vanessa Redgrave called Gabriel "a modern-day vampire".

In November 2009, the Beny Steinmetz Group (BSG) invested US$64.4 million in Gabriel, for 9% of the shares.

In June 2010, the BSG increased its investment in Gabriel by C$100 million.

In 2013, its rating was suspended by Scotia Capital.

In fall 2013, the Romanian government proposed to give Gabriel the right to expropriate land; this triggered mass protests and influenced the 2014 Romanian presidential election.

In January 2015, Newmont was listed as a substantial shareowner in Gabriel, which had at the time a market capitalisation of C$250 million.

In June 2017, the company sued the government of Romania for $4.4 billion at the World Bank Tribunal, due to delays in the Rosia Montana project. Gabriel claimed that there were several breaches of international investment treaties.

The company was delisted from the Toronto Stock Exchange in January 2018, and re-listed on the TSX-Venture.

In June 2018, Jonathan Henry departed the CEO position which had held for eight years.

On March 8, 2024, Gabriel Resources lost a damage claim against Romania for the failed gold mine project. An arbitration panel of the International Centre for Settlement of Investment Disputes rejected Gabriel's claim for damages resulting from Roșia Montană being blocked by the Romanian government, and instead awarded Romania US$10 million in legal fees and expenses.

== See also ==
- Rosia Montana Gold Corporation (RMGC)
- Roşia Montană
