= 2013 in Europe =

This is a list of 2013 events that occurred in Europe.

== Events ==
=== Albania ===
(Albania)

=== Andorra ===
(Andorra)

=== Azerbaijan ===
(Azerbaijan)

=== Belarus ===
(Belarus)

=== Belgium ===
(Belgium)

=== Bosnia and Herzegovina ===
(Bosnia and Herzegovina)

=== Bulgaria ===
(Bulgaria)

=== Croatia ===
(Croatia)

=== Czech Republic ===
(Czech Republic)

=== Cyprus ===
(Cyprus)

=== Denmark ===
(Denmark)

=== Estonia ===
(Estonia)

=== European Union ===
- President of the European Commission: José Manuel Barroso
- President of the Parliament: Martin Schulz
- President of the European Council: Herman Van Rompuy
- Presidency of the Council of the EU:
  - Ireland (January–July)
  - Lithuania (July–December)

=== Finland ===
(Finland)

=== France ===
(France)

=== Germany ===
(Germany)

=== Georgia ===
(Georgia (country))

=== Greece ===
(Greece)

=== Hungary ===
(Hungary)

=== Iceland ===
(Iceland)

=== Ireland ===
(Republic of Ireland)

=== Italy ===
(Italy)

=== Latvia ===
(Latvia)

=== Liechtenstein ===
(Liechtenstein)

=== Lithuania ===
(Lithuania)

=== Luxembourg ===
(Luxembourg)

=== Malta ===
(Malta)

=== Moldova ===
(Moldova)

=== Monaco ===
(Monaco)

=== Montenegro ===
(Montenegro)

=== Netherlands ===
(Netherlands)

=== North Macedonia ===
(North Macedonia)

=== Norway ===
(Norway)

=== Poland ===
(Poland)

=== Portugal ===
(Portugal)

=== Romania ===
(Romania)

=== Russia ===
(Russia)

=== San Marino ===
(San Marino)

=== Serbia ===
(Serbia)

=== Slovakia ===
(Slovakia)

=== Slovenia ===
(Slovenia)

=== Spain ===
(Spain)

=== Sweden ===
(Sweden)

=== Switzerland ===
(Switzerland)

=== Turkey ===
(Turkey)

=== Ukraine ===
(Ukraine)

=== United Kingdom ===
(United Kingdom)

=== Vatican City ===
(Vatican City)

== Events ==
=== January ===
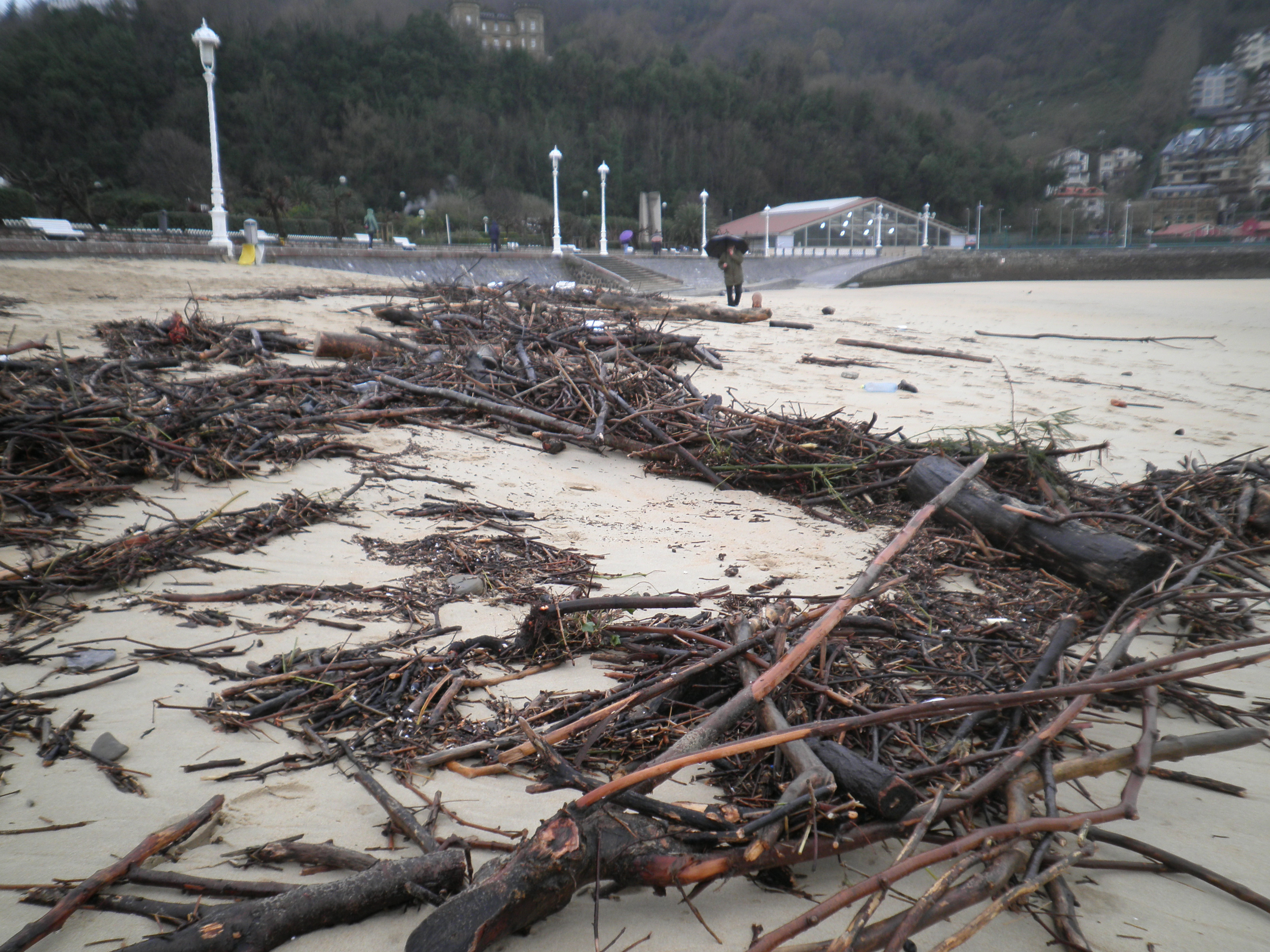
Basque Country floods, January 2013

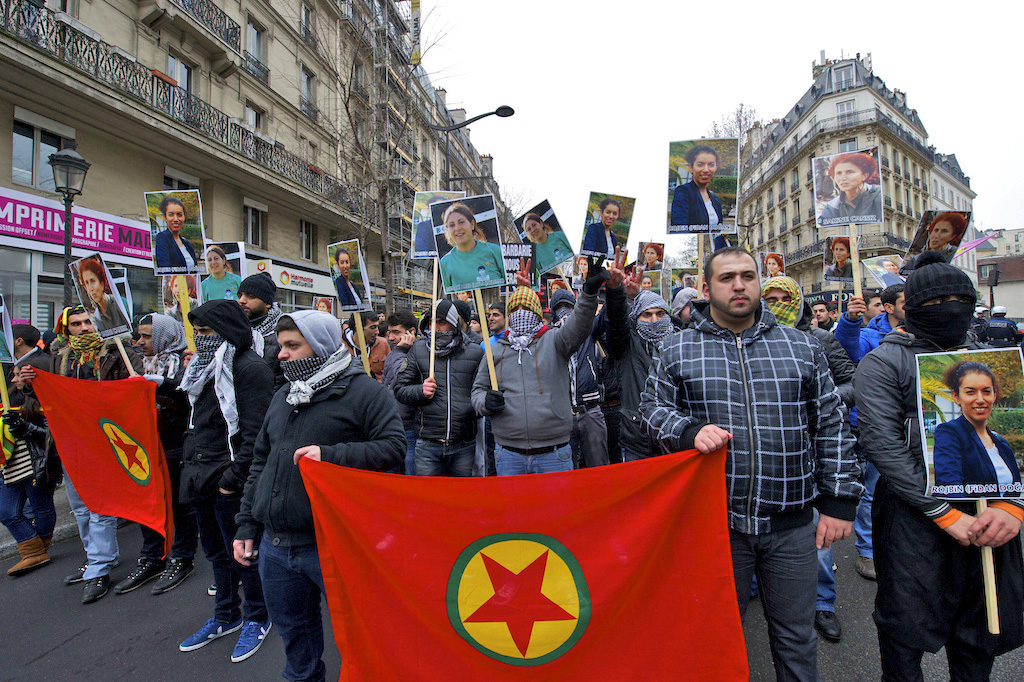
Demonstration in Paris for slain PKK workers

- January 1
  - Ireland assumed the Presidency of the Council of the European Union from Cyprus.
  - Marseille (France) and Košice (Slovakia) were named European Capitals of Culture.
  - Antwerp (Belgium) was named European Capital of Sport.
  - Maribor (Slovenia) was named European Youth Capital.
  - United Kingdom took over the presidency of the G8.
- January 2: Five people died and thirteen were injured in a fire ignited in Gennevilliers suburb of Paris.
- January 7: A gas leak inside a coal mine in northern Turkey killed eight workers.
- January 10: Three Kurdish female activists, including a co-founder of the Kurdistan Workers' Party, were shot dead in central Paris. The crime was condemned by the Kurdish community in Paris that organized a spontaneous protest as a sign of solidarity with the three women killed.
- January 13: More than 20,000 people marched through Moscow to protest Russia's new law banning Americans from adopting Russian children.
- January 15: One person died and more than 40 were injured on the E4 motorway near Helsingborg, Sweden, after an estimated 100 vehicles crashed into one another due to dense fog and slippery road conditions.
- January 16: Two people were killed and 13 were hurt when a helicopter crashed into a crane on a building in central London.
- January 19: Four climbers have died and a woman was seriously injured after an avalanche in Glencoe in the Scottish Highlands.
- January 26: Leftist former prime minister Miloš Zeman won the Czech Republic's first direct presidential election.
- January 27: Eleven people were killed and more than 30 injured when a bus slid off the road and plummeted into a ravine in central Portugal.

=== February ===
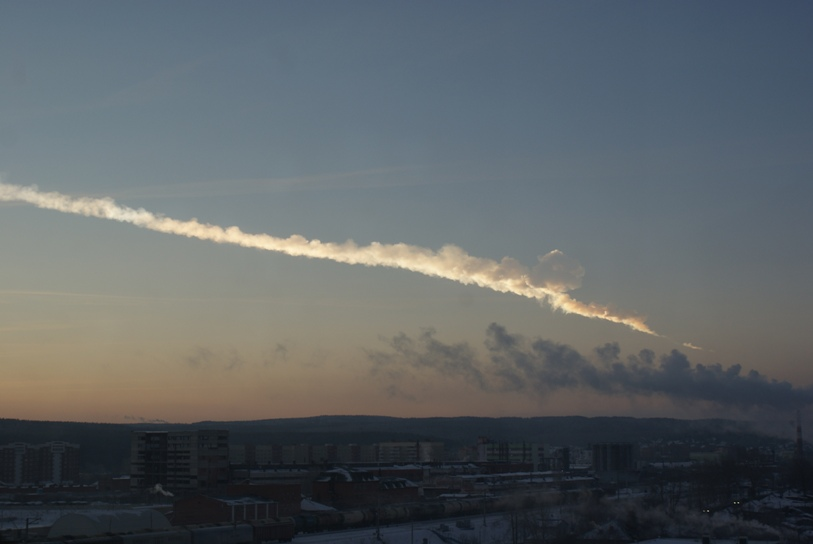
Chelyabinsk meteor

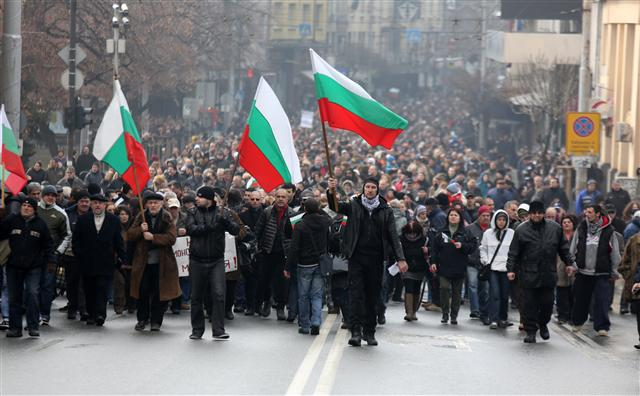
Protest in Sofia, February 17, 2013

- February 9
  - Five people were killed in a plane crash at Charleroi airport in Belgium. The airport was closed shortly after the crash.
  - German Education Minister, Annette Schavan, resigned after Heinrich Heine University of Düsseldorf stripped her of her doctorate over plagiarism accusations.
- February 11
  - An underground methane gas explosion killed up to 18 miners at a coal pit in northern Russia.
  - A minibus exploded on the Syria–Turkey border, killing at least 13 people and injuring 50 others.
- February 13: At least five people were killed when a plane carrying football fans attempted an emergency landing and caught fire in the eastern Ukrainian city of Donetsk.
- February 15: A Chelyabinsk meteor broke up in the vicinity of the city of Chelyabinsk, Russia. According to Chelyabinsk's health department, around 1,200 people were injured, two of whom seriously, from the shattering of windows caused by the shockwaves and the debris.
- February 18: Incumbent Armenian President Serzh Sargsyan won Armenia's presidential election with over 58 percent of the vote.
- February 20: Bulgaria's government resigned from office after nationwide protests against high electricity prices and austerity measures.
- February 21: Some 30,000 angry workers took to the streets of Brussels to demonstrate against austerity measures planned by the Belgian government.
- February 24: Nicos Anastasiades, the conservative leader in Cyprus, won the presidential election with 57.5% of the vote.
- February 27: A shooting at a wood-processing company in central Switzerland has left three people dead and seven wounded, some of them seriously.
- February 28
  - Benedict XVI resigned as Pope, the first to do so since Gregory XII in 1415, and the first to do so voluntarily since Celestine V in 1294.
  - Parliament of Slovenia ousted Prime Minister Janez Janša amid corruption allegations.

=== March ===
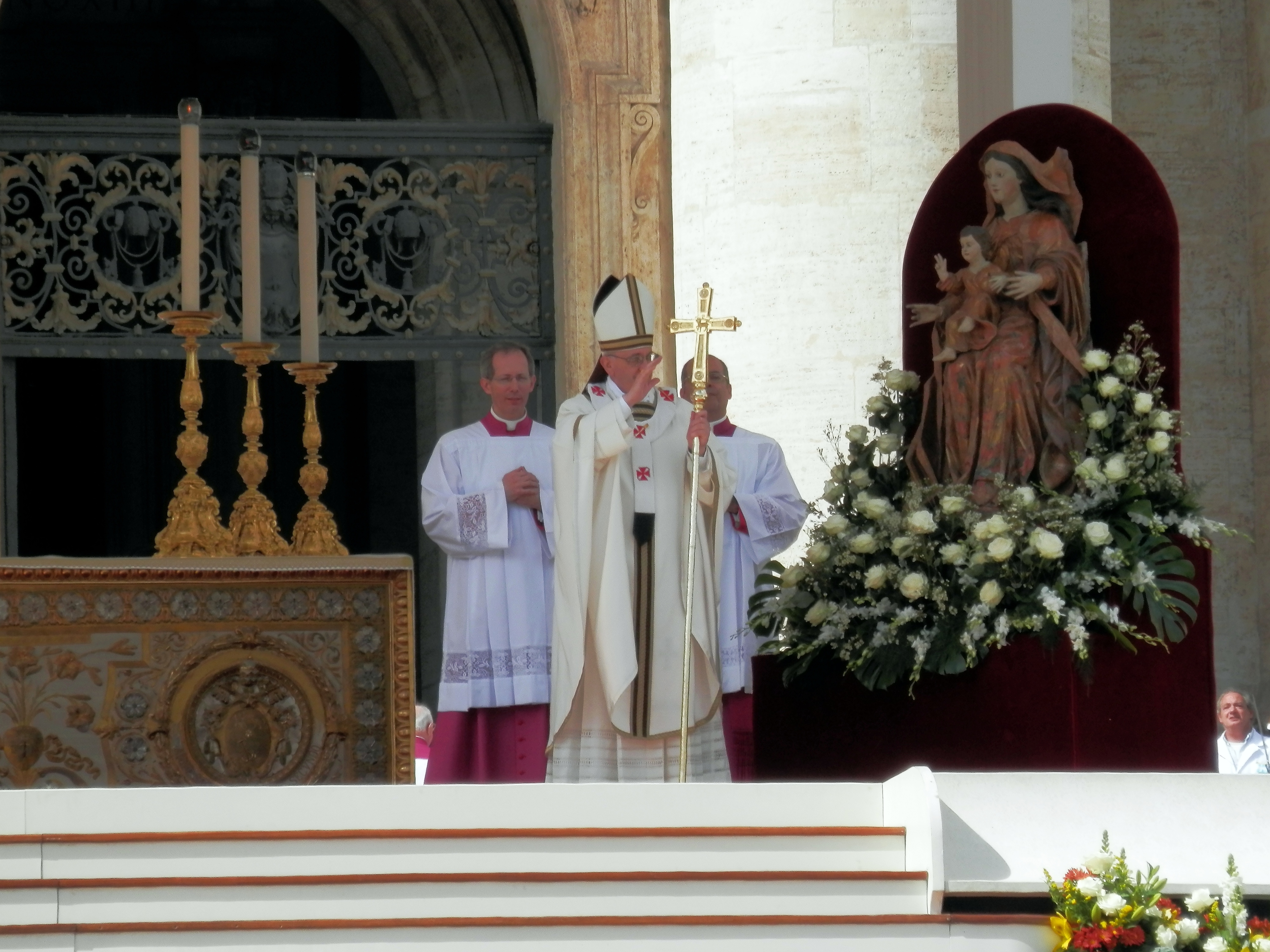
Inauguration of Pope Francis, March 19, 2013

- March 5: The Government of Moldova, led by Prime Minister Vlad Filat, was dismissed after a motion of censure voted by 54 MPs.
- March 10: A fire at a mixed-use building in the southwestern German town of Backnang killed eight people.
- March 13: Argentine Cardinal Jorge Mario Bergoglio was elected the Catholic Church's Pope, taking the name Francis I.
- March 15: About fifty cars were involved in a chain accident on the M7 motorway in Hungary. At least one person died and another 40 were wounded.
- March 16: Eurozone finance ministers agreed a 10 billion-euro bailout package for Cyprus to save the country from bankruptcy.
- March 19: Two football fans were killed and 52 injured in a bus crash in central Poland.
- March 28: A bus crash in northwest Russia killed six people and injured at least 23 others, including orphans returning from a field trip.

=== April ===
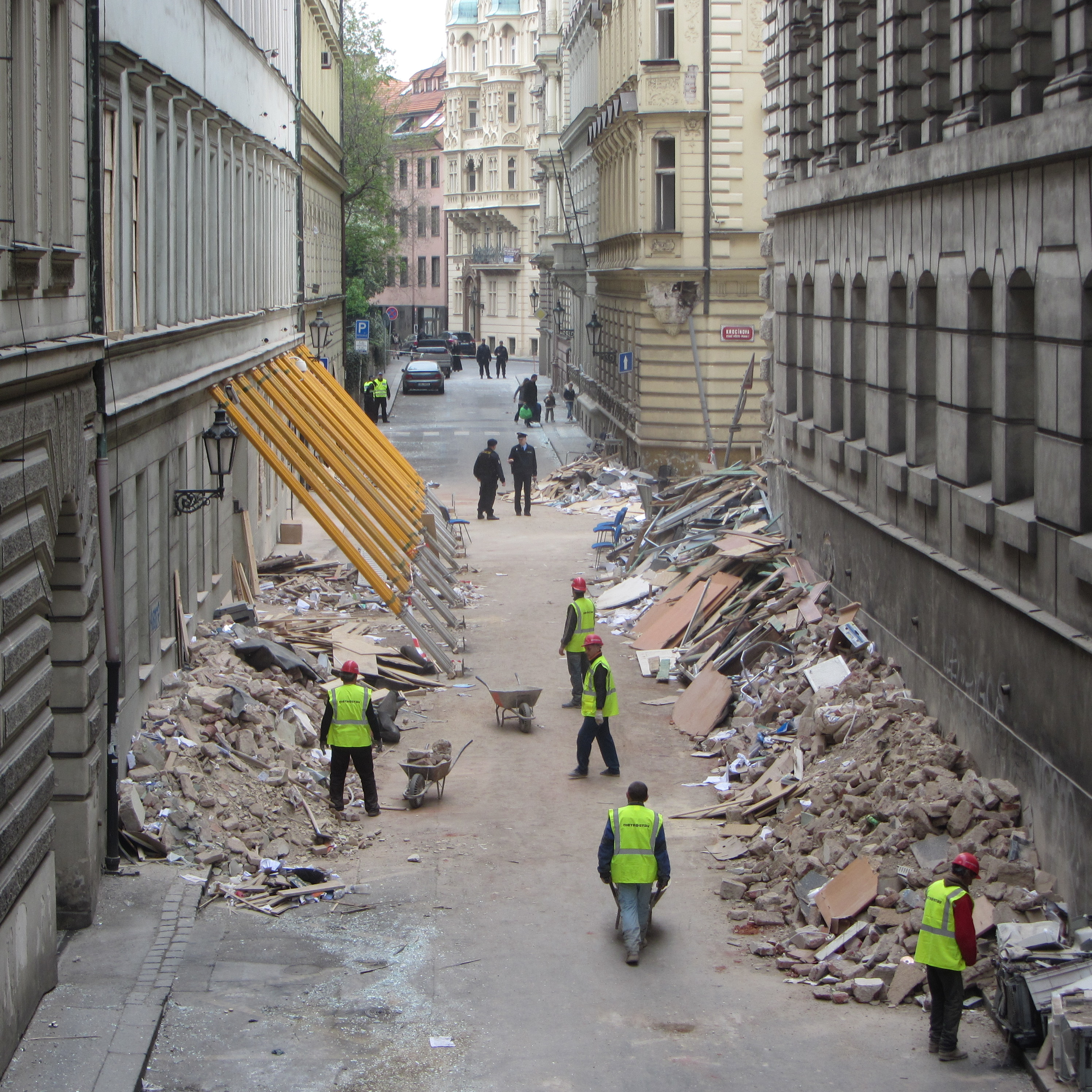
Divadelní Street in Prague's Old Town following the explosion

- April 2: Zafferana Etnea, a small tourist town in the province of Catania, Italy, was covered in ash after Mount Etna erupted.
- April 7: Incumbent Filip Vujanović has won Montenegro's presidential election with 51.2% of the vote.
- April 9: Thirteen people were killed in Serbia after a man went on a gun rampage in a village near Belgrade.
- April 20: Giorgio Napolitano was re-elected President of Italy with 738 votes in the sixth ballot amid widespread protests by MPs eager to elect Stefano Rodotà.
- April 22: A man went on a shooting rampage outside a firearm shop in Belgorod, Russia, killing six people.
- April 26: A fire in a psychiatric hospital in the Russian town of Ramensky killed 38 people.
- April 29: A powerful explosion badly damaged an office building in the center of Prague, injuring up to 43 people.
- April 30: Queen Beatrix of the Netherlands signed the official acts of abdication in favor of her son the Prince of Orange, who becomes King Willem-Alexander, the first male monarch in 123 years.

=== May ===
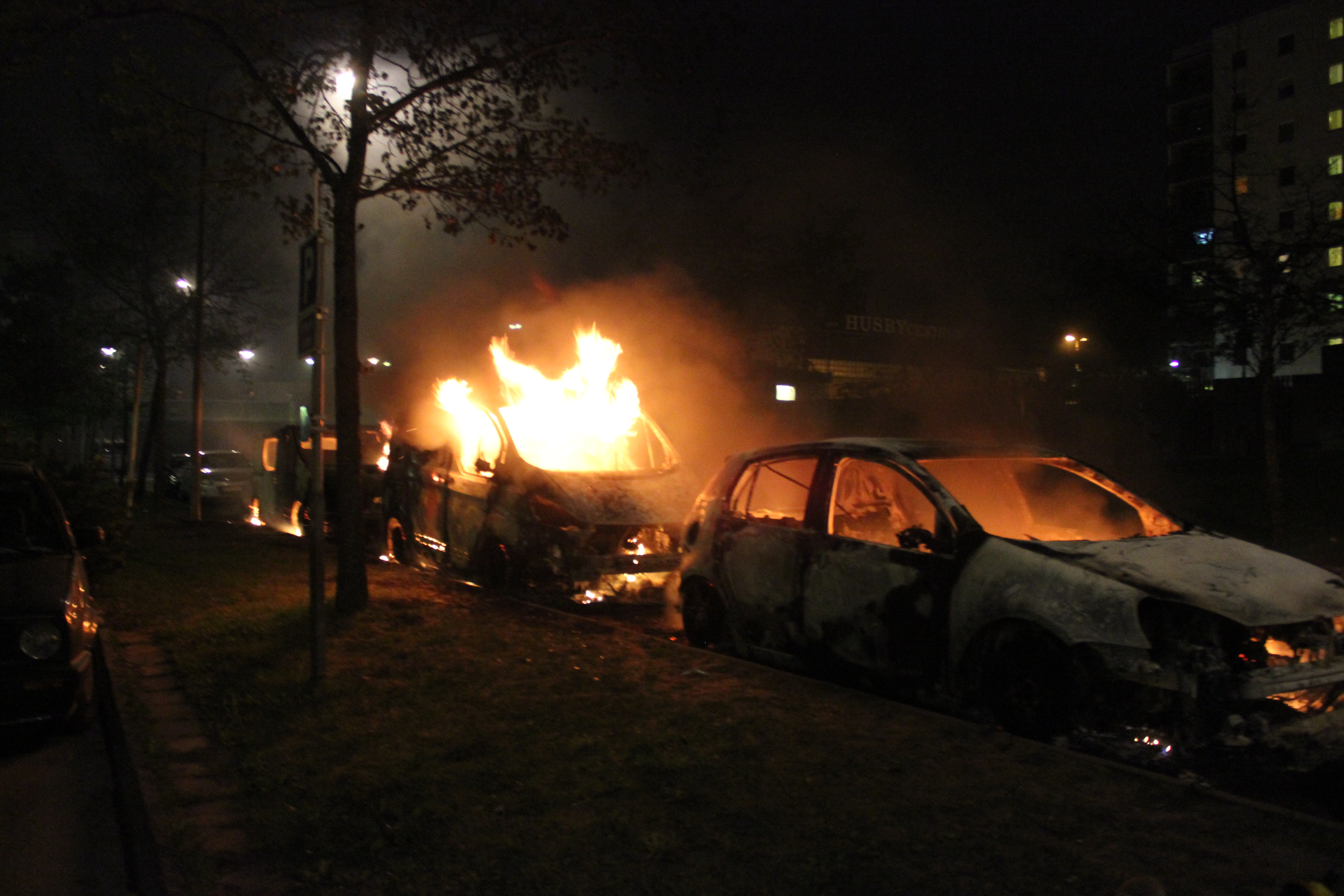
Cars on fire during the Stockholm riots

- May 1
  - Three policemen were killed and two wounded after unknown assailants opened gun fire on their car in Buynaksk, Russia.
  - At least 20 people were arrested and 10 injured after protesters and police clashed in Istanbul.
- May 3: Twenty people were injured and more than one hundred houses were damaged in a series of tornadoes in Northern Italy.
- May 8: A fuel train derailed in Russia's Rostov Oblast causing a massive fire with one person missing, 44 injured and 3,000 evacuated.
- May 11: 52 people were killed and over 140 injured in two car bombings in Reyhanlı, Turkey, near the Syrian border.
- May 20
  - At least four people were killed and 46 injured after two bombs exploded in the capital of Russia's Dagestan Republic, Makhachkala.
  - Three Brazilian tourists have been killed and 22 more wounded after two hot-air balloons collided in Turkey.
- May 22: British Army soldier Lee Rigby was killed by two attackers in Woolwich district of London. Both were subsequently shot and apprehended by police. The UK government treated this murdering as a terrorist incident.
- May 23: A series of unprecedented riots in Stockholm resulted in widespread damage and seven arrests.
- May 26: Nearly 300 people have been arrested during demonstrations in Paris over a new law allowing gay marriage.
- May 31: Eight people died and more than 8,163 sustained injuries after police and demonstrators clashed in Taksim Square, Istanbul.

=== June ===
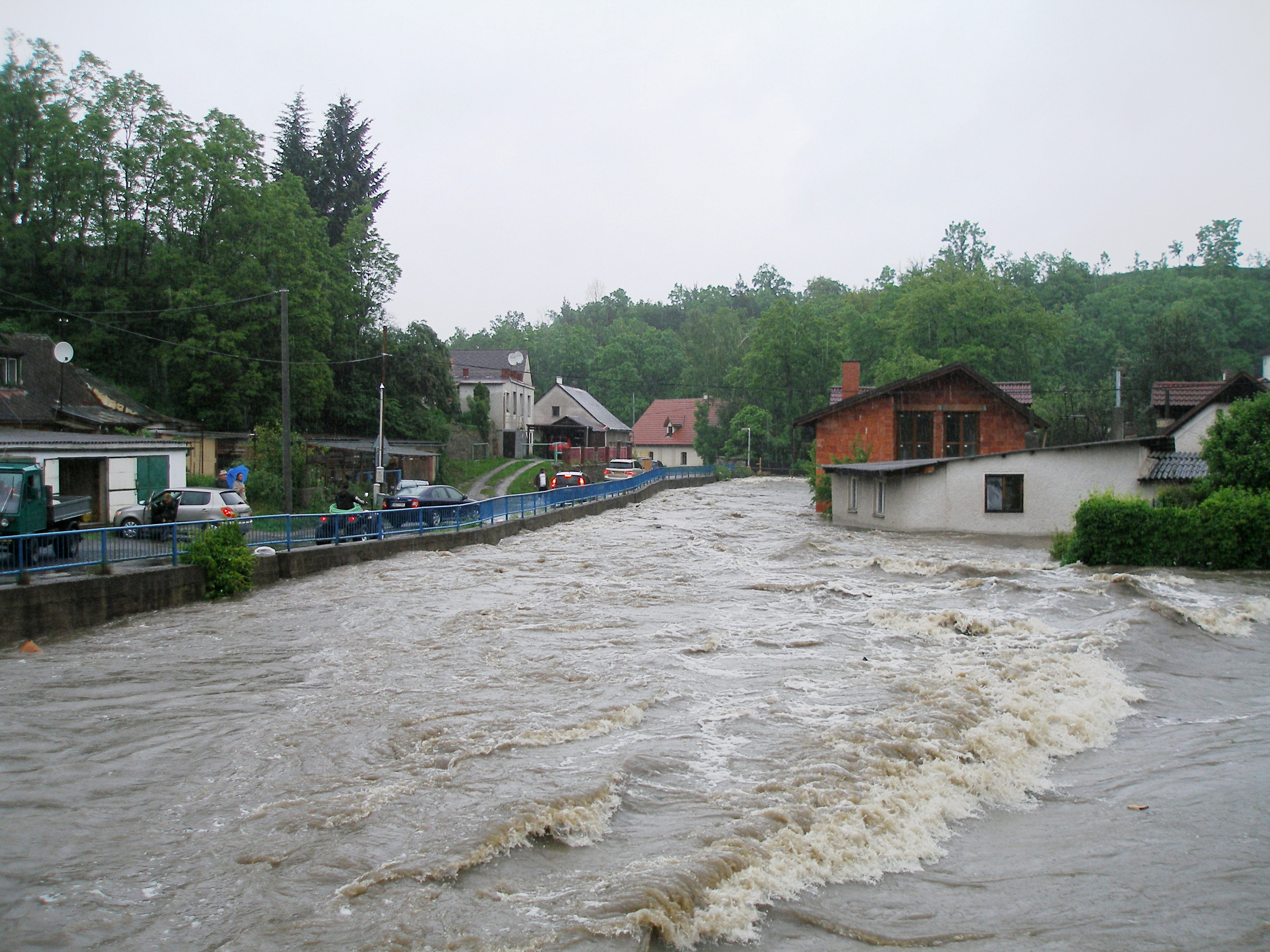
Flooding in Nový Knín, Czech Republic on June 2, 2013

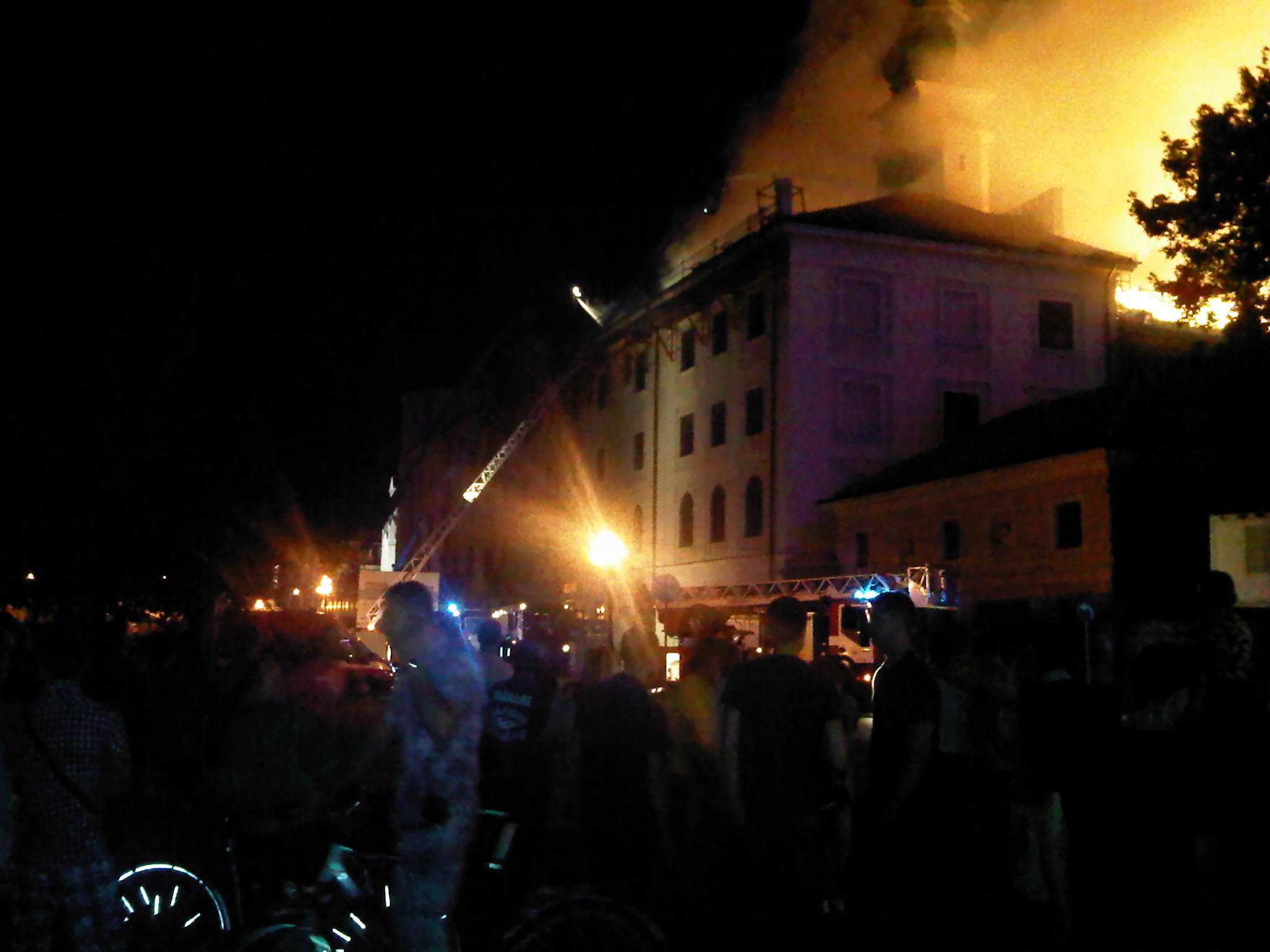
Riga Castle fire

- June 3: At least 24 people have died as torrential rains in central Europe caused landslides and widespread flooding.
- June 5: The two-time prime minister of Slovenia, Janez Janša, has been convicted of corruption and sentenced to two years in prison.
- June 17: The Prime Minister of the Czech Republic, Petr Nečas, submitted his resignation following a corruption scandal.
- June 19: At least 43 people sought medical help and more than 6,500 residents were evacuated in Russia's southwestern Samara Oblast, after ammunition explosions shook a military training area.
- June 21: A major fire has caused extensive damage to Riga Castle, official residence of the Latvian president and home of Latvia's National History Museum.
- June 23: A bus carrying Romanian tourists plunged into a ravine near Morača Monastery, Montenegro, killing 18 and wounding 29.
- June 24: Former Italian Prime Minister Silvio Berlusconi was sentenced to seven years in prison for abusing power and having sex with an underage prostitute.

=== July ===
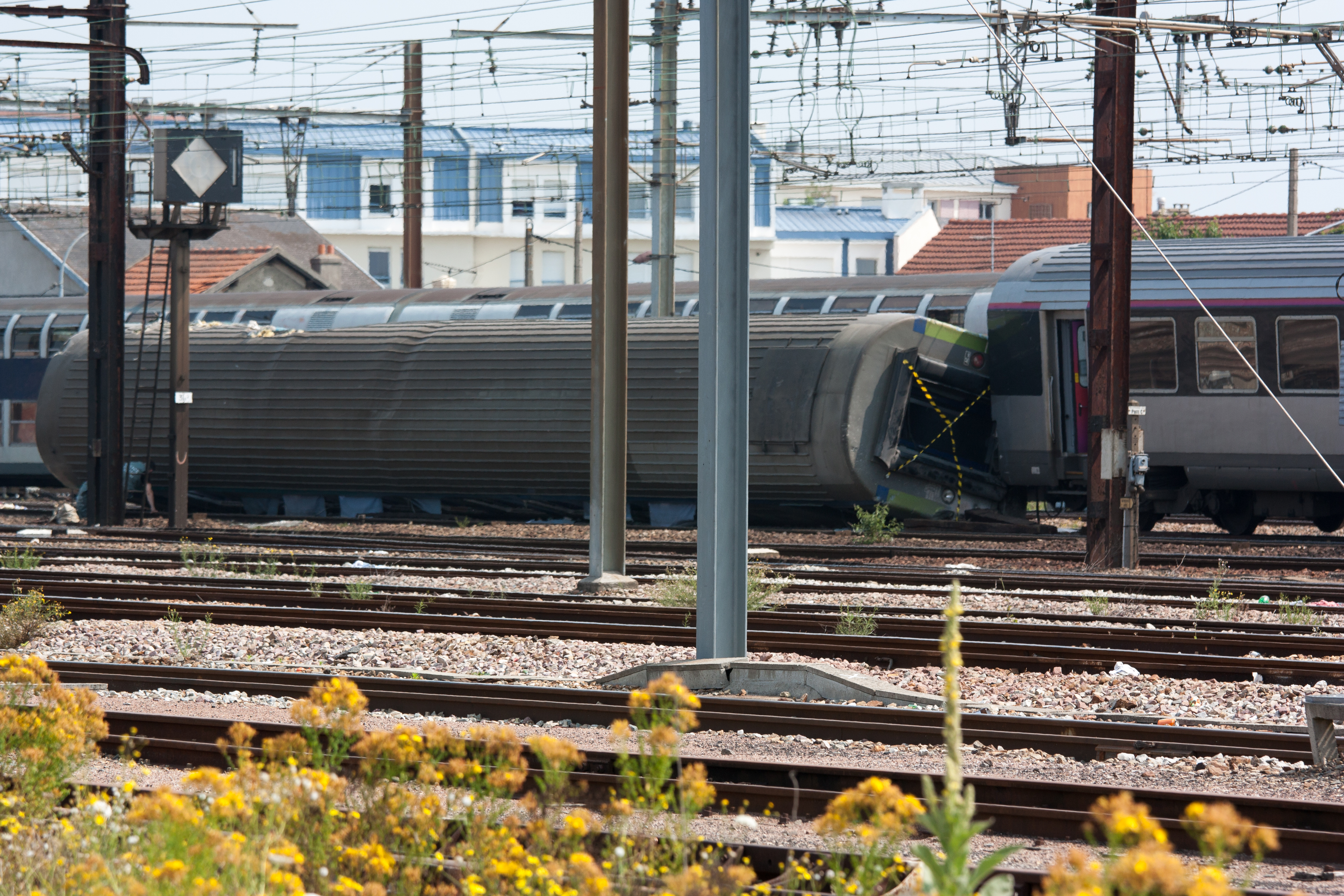
Brétigny-sur-Orge train crash

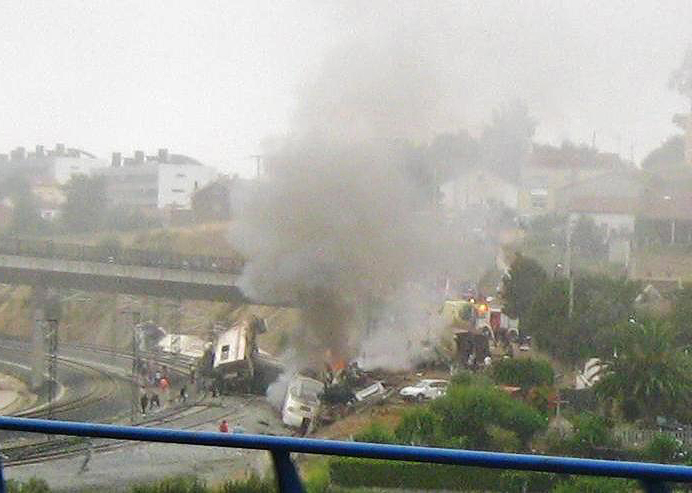
Santiago de Compostela derailment

- July 1
  - Lithuania assumed the Presidency of the Council of the European Union from Ireland.
  - Croatia becomes the 28th member of the European Union.
- July 7: Up to 80 people have been injured, after a passenger train derailed in Russia's southern region of Krasnodar.
- July 8: Nine people have died and 21 were injured after a bus careered off the road near the town of Avila, central Spain.
- July 11: Luxembourg PM Jean-Claude Juncker has resigned after losing parliamentary support over a spy scandal.
- July 13
  - At least six people were killed and 192 injured in a train derailment in Paris suburb of Brétigny-sur-Orge.
  - 18 people were killed and 45 injured after a gravel truck smashed into a bus near Podolsk, Russia.
- July 21: King Albert II of Belgium abdicated in favour of his son Prince Phillipe.
- July 24: Santiago de Compostela derailment: 79 people were killed and 131 injured; after a high-speed train derailed near Santiago de Compostela, Spain.
- July 28: A coach has plunged off a flyover in southern Italy, leaving 39 people dead and 8 injured.
- July 29: One man died and another 44 people were injured in a collision between two trains in western Switzerland.

=== August ===
- August 5: A semi-trailer truck caught fire in Norway's Gudvanga Tunnel, leading to the evacuation of 160 people, 55 of whom were hospitalized due to smoke inhalation and other injuries.
- August 6: An ammonia leak at Horlivka chemical plant, Ukraine, has killed five people and sickened more than 20.
- August 20
  - Russian police killed nine suspected militants, including a prominent warlord, in a clash in the restive North Caucasus republic of Dagestan.
  - At least three people have been killed and five others injured when a gunman opened fire in a restaurant in a village in southern Germany.
- August 23: Four people have died after a Super Puma helicopter, carrying 18, crashed into the sea near Shetland.
- August 28: A small plane crashed in western Germany, killing four adults and one child and injuring three other children.
- August 30: A motorway pile-up killed three Romanians and injured 33 other people, including Bulgarians, Serbs and Turks, close to the Hungarian capital Budapest.

=== September ===
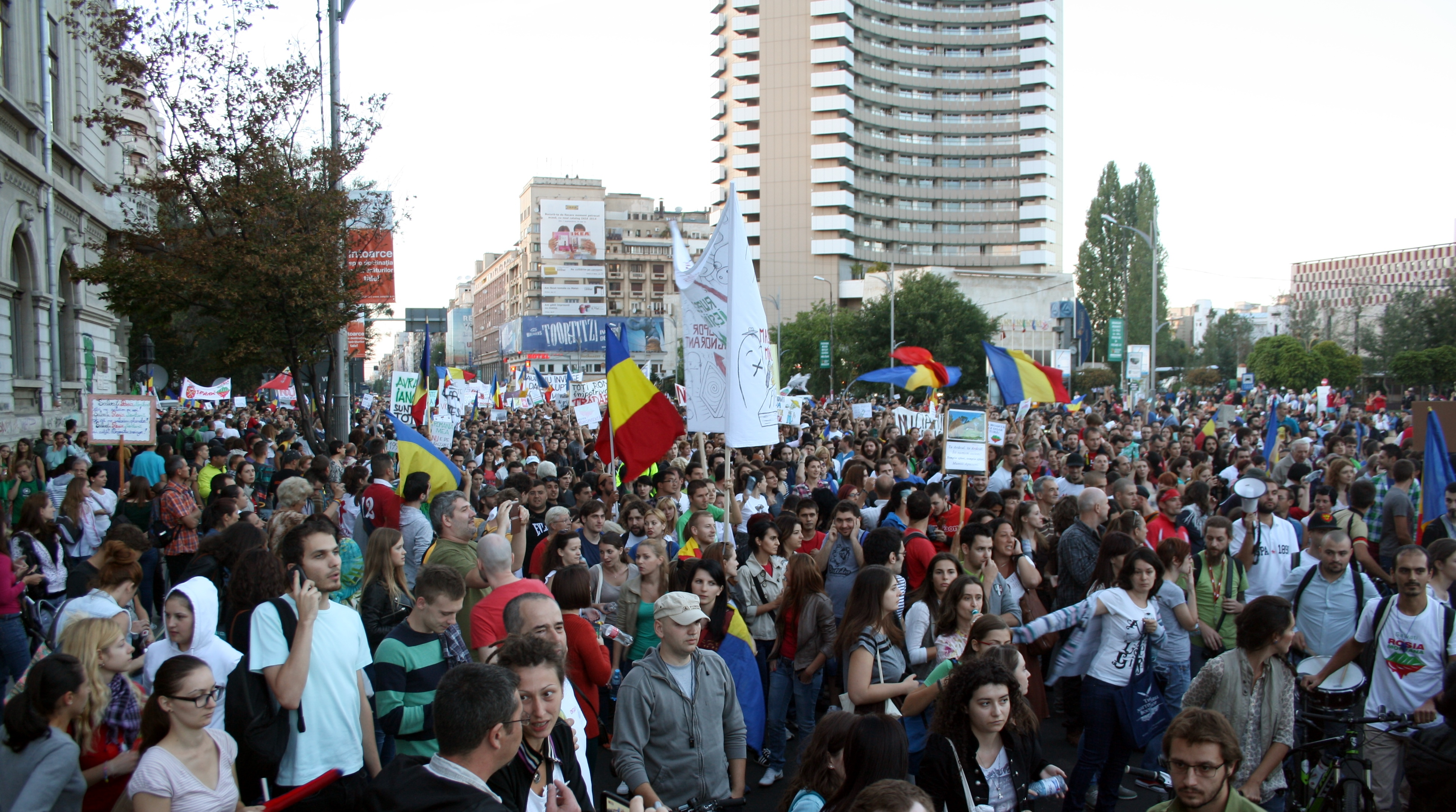
Protesters against the Roșia Montană Project marching in Bucharest, September 1

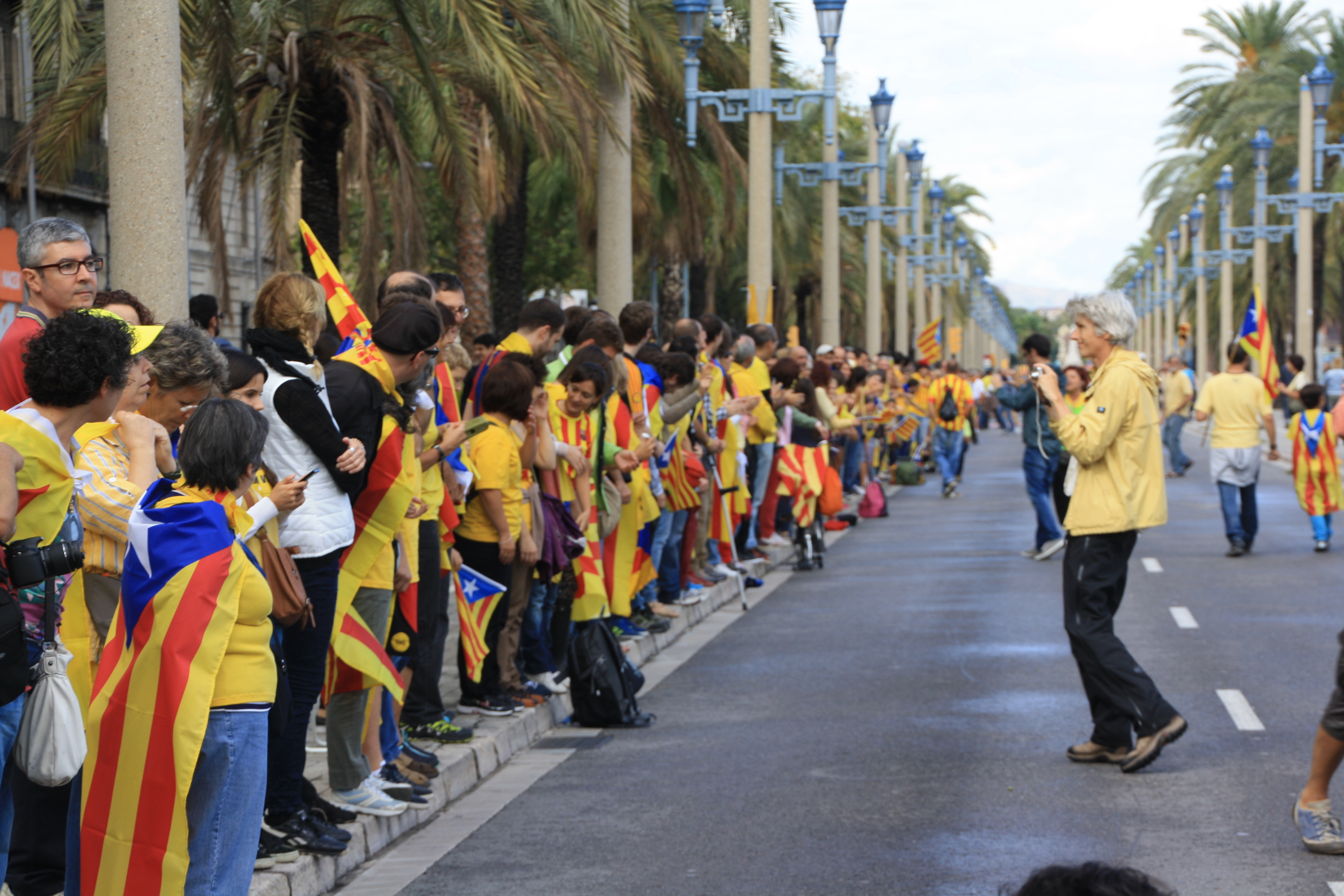
Catalan Way on Colom Avenue, Barcelona

- September 1: Hundreds of thousands of people protested in major Romanian cities against the Roșia Montană Project.
- September 8: Eleven people died when their minibus was hit by a passenger train at a level crossing near Iași, Romania.
- September 10: An embargo was imposed by Russia on imports of Moldovan wine.
- September 11: More than one million Catalans formed a human chain in support of the independence of Catalonia.
- September 12
  - Flash floods in the eastern Galați region of Romania have left nine people dead and forced thousands to evacuate.
  - Three people died and another 29 were injured after two coaches collided in Nădlac, Romania.
- September 13: 37 people have died in a fire at a psychiatric hospital in Russia's Novgorod Region.
- September 16: A poacher shot dead three police officers and a paramedic in Annaberg, Austria.
- September 22: Chancellor Angela Merkel's conservative party has won German federal election, with 33.8% of the votes.

=== October ===
- October 3: At least 359 African migrants have died and 50 are missing after a boat carrying them to Europe sank off the southern Italian island of Lampedusa.
- October 11: At least 27 people died when a boat carrying more than 200 migrants capsized in the Strait of Sicily.
- October 13: Over 380 people were detained after an anti-migrant Russian nationalist riot in southern Moscow.
- October 19: Ten parachutists and a pilot have died after the plane they were in crashed shortly after taking off in Belgium.
- October 21: A suspected female suicide bomber has set off explosives on a bus in the southern Russian city of Volgograd, killing six people and injuring 37.
- October 25: The St Jude storm hit Northern Europe causing at least 17 deaths with flights and train services cancelled.
- October 28: A gas leak at a coal mine in Spain has killed six people and left five injured.

=== November ===
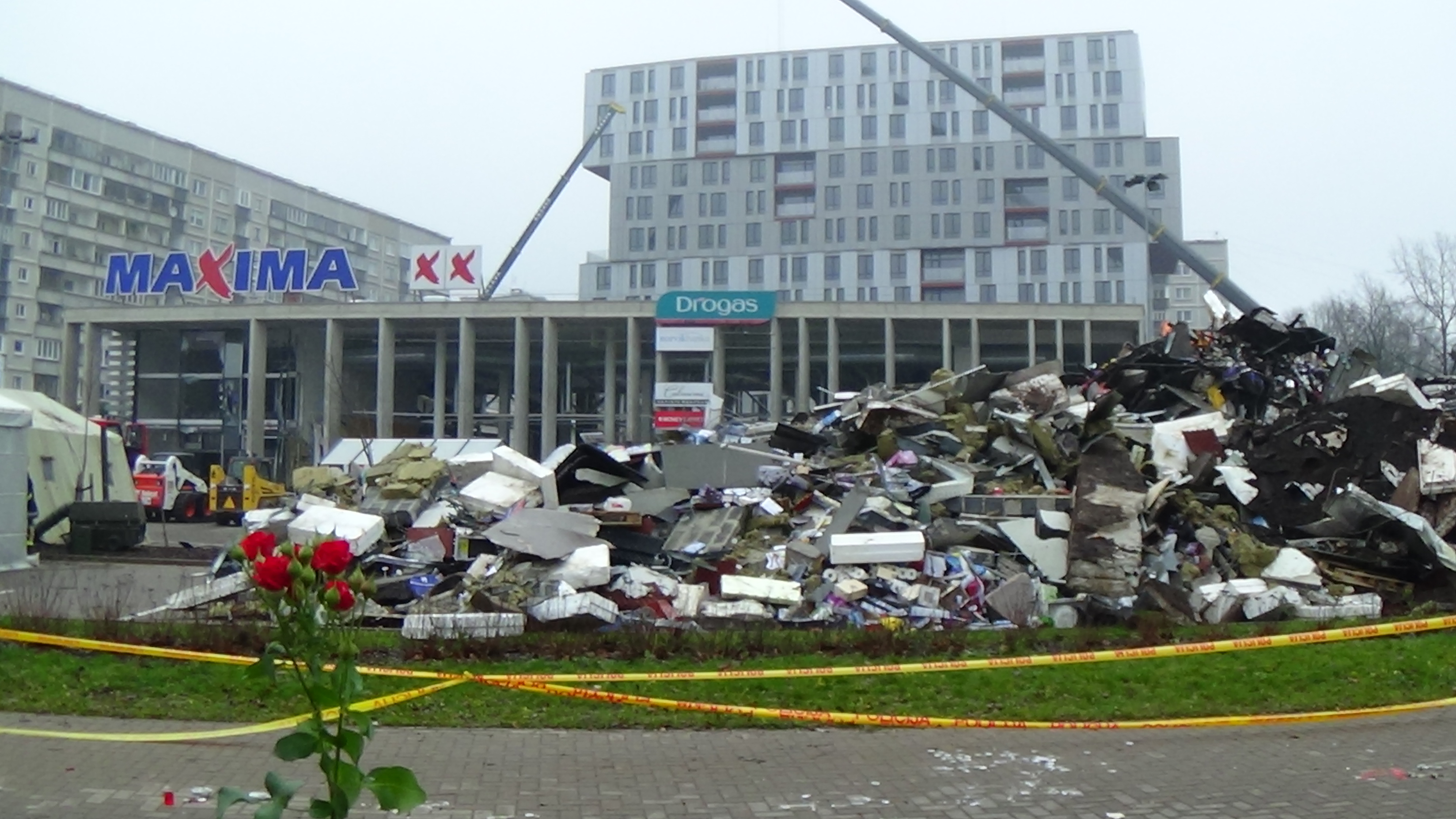
Riga supermarket roof collapse

- November 1: Two people, members of the far-right Greek political party Golden Dawn, were killed in a drive-by shooting, outside the offices of Golden Dawn in Neo Irakleio, Athens.
- November 4: A man fatally stabbed three people on a bus en route between Årdal and Tyin in Norway.
- November 15: Twelve migrants were found dead after a plastic boat capsized off the coast of Lefkada, Greece.
- November 18: A passenger plane has crashed at an airport in the Russian city of Kazan, killing all 50 people on board.
- November 19: At least 18 people have been killed in flooding prompted by a cyclone and heavy rain that lashed the Italian island of Sardinia.
- November 21: At least 54 people have been killed and 39 injured after the roof of a Maxima superstore collapsed in Riga, Latvia.
- November 30: Nine people were killed and 32 injured after a police helicopter crashed into a busy pub in Glasgow.

=== December ===
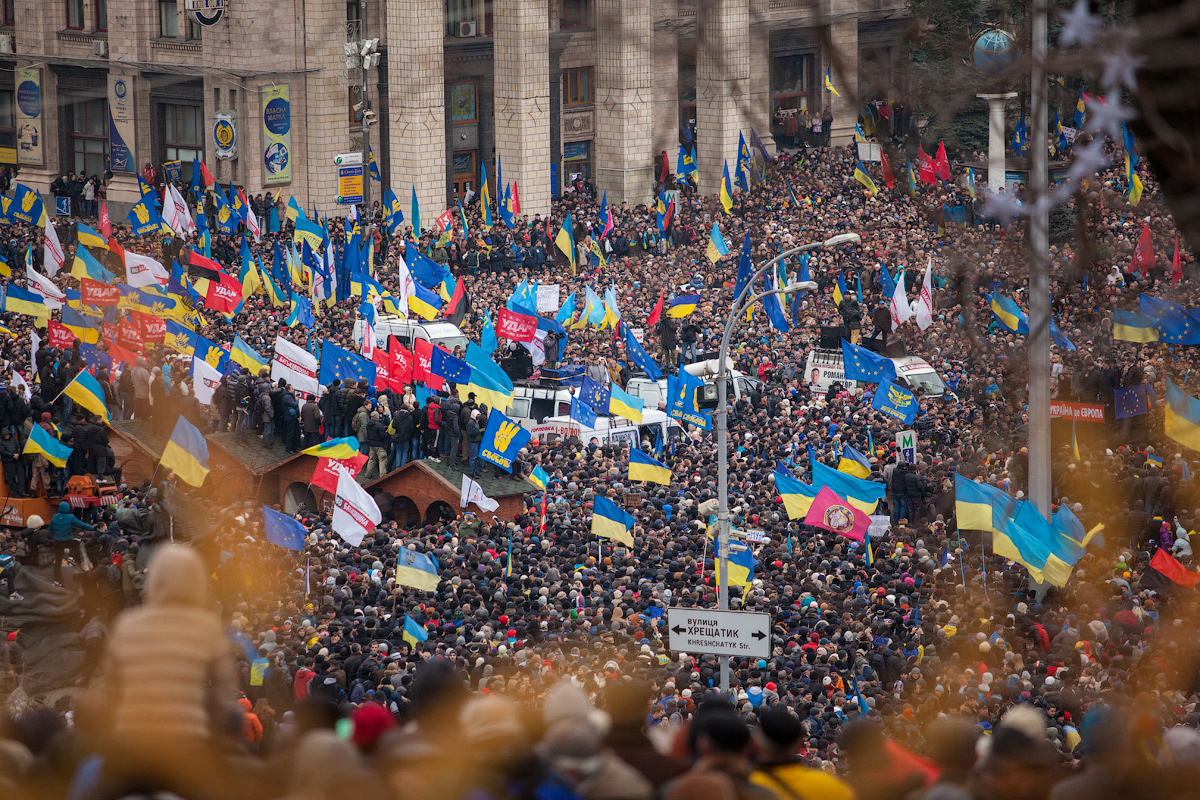
Euromaidan in Kyiv, 2 December

- December 1: Between 400,000 and 800,000 people protested in Kyiv, Ukraine, against the decision of Viktor Yanukovych's government to suspend preparations for signing of the association agreement with the European Union under pressure from Russia.
- December 5: The Constitutional Court of Moldova recognized Romanian as country's official language.
- December 19: Part of the ornate ceiling of the Apollo Theatre in London collapsed during a performance, injuring at least 81 people in the audience.
- December 29: A suicide bomber killed at least 17 people and wounded 38 others in an attack on a train station in the southern Russian city of Volgograd.
- December 30: At least 14 people have been killed and 28 injured in a suicide bombing on a trolleybus in the Russian city of Volgograd.

== Deaths ==
=== January ===
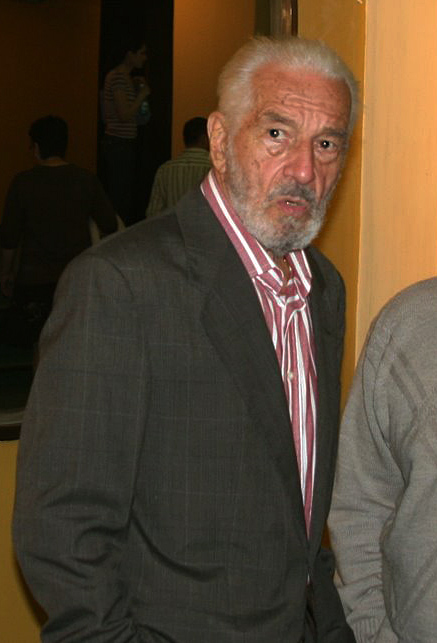
Sergiu Nicolaescu

- January 3: Sergiu Nicolaescu, 82, Romanian film director, actor and politician. (born 1930)
- January 6: Gerard Helders, 107, Dutch politician. (born 1905)
- January 15: Princess Margarita of Baden, 80. (born 1932)
- January 21: Michael Winner, 77, English film director and producer. (born 1935)
- January 23: Józef Glemp, 83, Polish Cardinal of the Roman Catholic Church. (born 1929)

=== February ===
- February 16: Tony Sheridan, 72, English rock and roll singer-songwriter and guitarist. (born 1940)
- February 18: Kevin Ayers, 68, English singer-songwriter. (born 1944)
- February 22: Wolfgang Sawallisch, 89, German conductor and pianist. (born 1923)
- February 23: Julien Ries, 92, Belgian Cardinal of the Catholic Church. (born 1920)
- February 26: Stéphane Hessel, 95, French diplomat and writer. (born 1917)

=== March ===
- March 6: Alvin Lee, 68, English rock guitarist and singer. (born 1944)
- March 7
  - Peter Banks, 65, English guitarist. (born 1947)
  - Damiano Damiani, 90, Italian screenwriter, film director, actor and writer. (born 1922)
- March 10: Princess Lilian, Duchess of Halland, 97. (born 1915)
- March 12: Clive Burr, 56, English drummer. (born 1957)
- March 19: Irina Petrescu, 71, Romanian film actress. (born 1941)
- March 21: Pietro Mennea, 60, Italian sprinter and politician. (born 1952)
- March 23: Boris Berezovsky, 67, Russian business oligarch. (born 1946)
- March 27: Hjalmar Andersen, 90, Norwegian skater. (born 1923)
- March 28: Richard Griffiths, 65, English actor of stage, film and television. (born 1947)

=== April ===
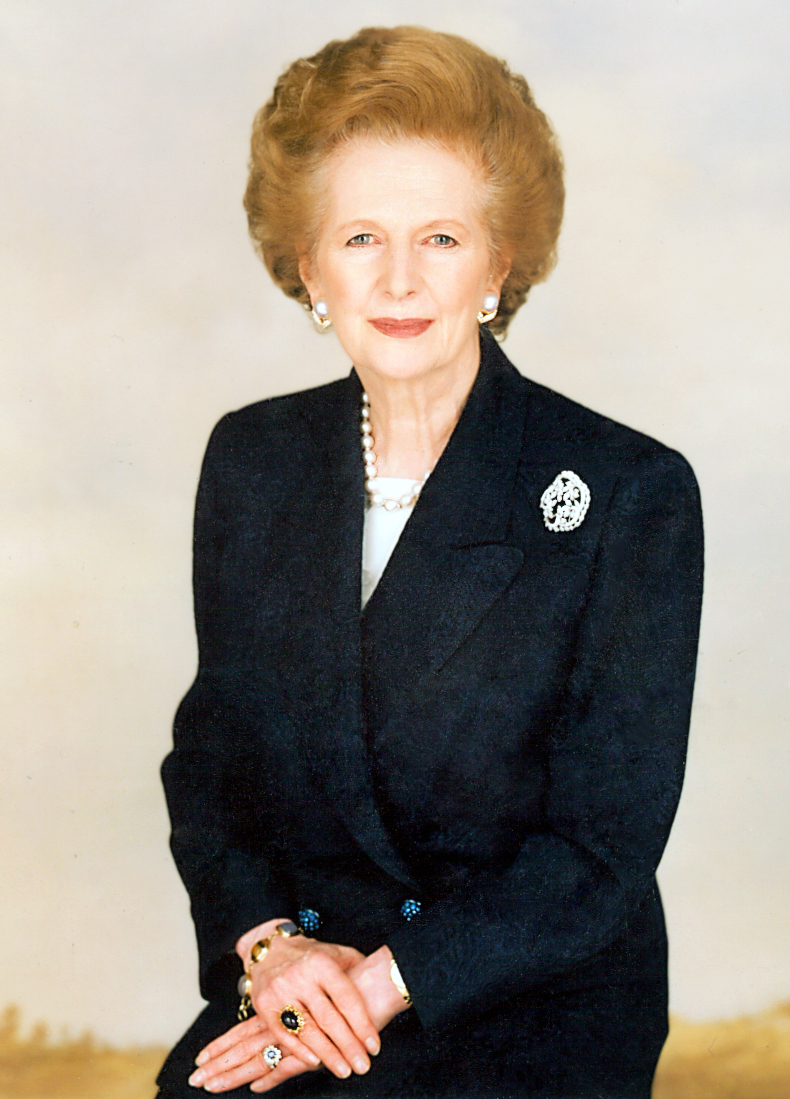
Margaret Thatcher

- April 2: Jesús Franco, 82, Spanish film director, writer, cinematographer and actor. (born 1930)
- April 3: Ruth Prawer Jhabvala, 85, German-born British novelist and screenwriter. (born 1927)
- April 8
  - Margaret Thatcher, 87, former Prime Minister of the United Kingdom. (born 1925)
  - Sara Montiel, 85, Spanish singer and actress. (born 1928)
- April 9: Paolo Soleri, 93, Italian-born American architect. (born 1919)
- April 10: Robert G. Edwards, 87, British Nobel physiologist. (born 1925)
- April 11: Hilary Koprowski, 96, Polish virologist and immunologist. (born 1916)
- April 14: Colin Davis, 85, English conductor. (born 1927)
- April 18: Storm Thorgerson, 69, English graphic designer. (born 1944)
- April 19: François Jacob, 92, French Nobel biologist. (born 1920)
- April 28: János Starker, 88, Hungarian-born American cellist. (born 1924)

=== May ===
- May 4: Christian de Duve, 95, Belgian Nobel cytologist and biochemist. (born 1917)
- May 6: Giulio Andreotti, 94, 41st Prime Minister of Italy. (born 1919)
- May 9: Alfredo Landa, 80, Spanish actor. (born 1933)
- May 9: Heinrich Rohrer, 79, Swiss Nobel physicist (born 1933)
- May 22: Henri Dutilleux, 97, French composer. (born 1916)
- May 23: Georges Moustaki, 79, French singer-songwriter. (born 1934)

=== June ===
- June 7: Pierre Mauroy, 84, Prime Minister of France (1981–1984). (born 1928)
- June 9: Iain Banks, 59, Scottish author. (born 1954)
- June 15: Heinz Flohe, 65, German footballer and manager. (born 1948)
- June 16
  - Josip Kuže, 60, Croatian football coach and former player. (born 1952)
  - Ottmar Walter, 89, German footballer. (born 1924)
- June 19: Gyula Horn, 80, 3rd Prime Minister of the Republic of Hungary. (born 1932)
- June 24: Emilio Colombo, 93, 40th Prime Minister of Italy. (born 1920)
- June 26: Marc Rich, 78, Belgian businessman. (born 1934)
- June 27: Alain Mimoun, 92, French runner and Olympic marathon champion. (born 1921)

=== July ===
- July 3: Radu Vasile, 70, Prime Minister of Romania (1998–1999). (born 1942)
- July 19
  - Mel Smith, 60, English comedian, writer, film director, producer and actor. (born 1952)
  - Bert Trautmann, 89, German-born British professional footballer. (born 1923)
- July 25: Bernadette Lafont, 74, French actress. (born 1938)
- July 30: Antoni Ramallets, 89, Spanish footballer. (born 1924)

=== August ===
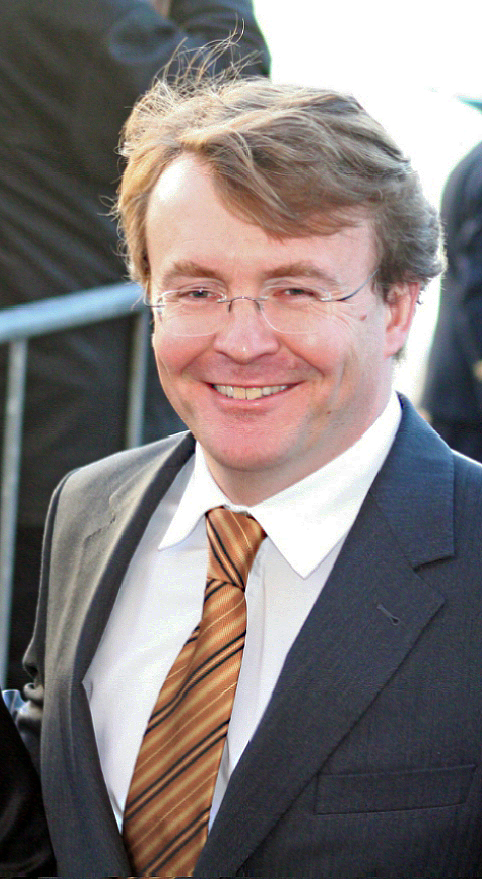
Prince Friso of Orange-Nassau

- August 10: László Csizsik-Csatáry, 98, Hungarian Nazi war criminal. (born 1915)
- August 12: Prince Friso of Orange-Nassau, 44, Dutch royal. (born 1968)
- August 18
  - Dezső Gyarmati, 85, Hungarian water polo player. (born 1927)
  - Florin Cioabă, 58, self-proclaimed king of the Gypsies. (born 1954)
- August 20: Marian McPartland, 95, English-born American jazz pianist. (born 1918)
- August 30: Seamus Heaney, 74, Irish Nobel poet. (born 1939)
- August 31: David Frost, 74, British journalist and broadcaster. (born 1939)

=== September ===
- September 2: Ronald Coase, 102, British Nobel economist. (born 1910)
- September 5: Rochus Misch, 96, German bodyguard of Adolf Hitler. (born 1917)
- September 23: Geo Saizescu, 80, Romanian actor and film director. (born 1932)

=== October ===
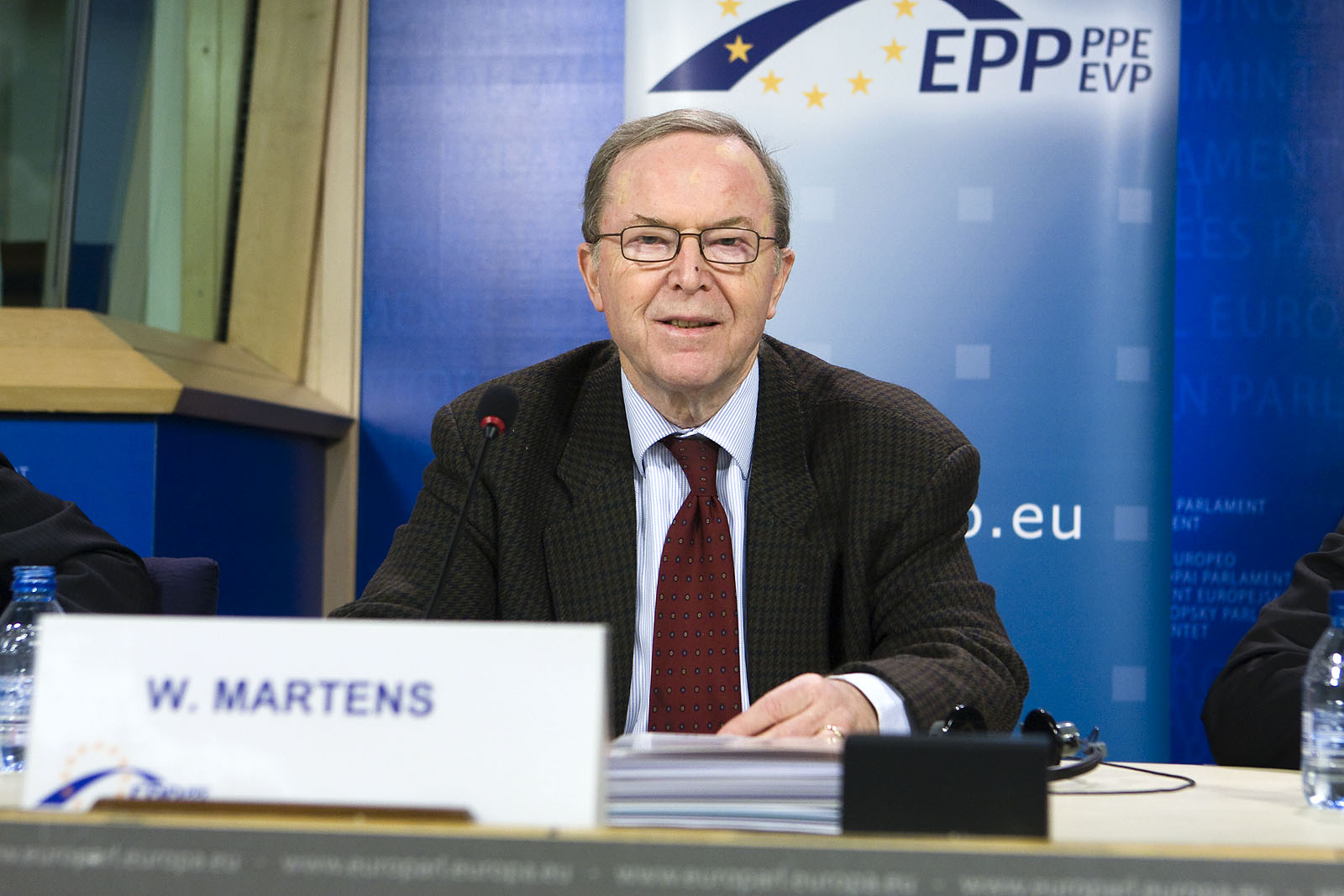
Wilfried Martens

- October 3: Sergei Belov, 69, Russian professional basketball player. (born 1944)
- October 7: Patrice Chéreau, 68, French opera and theatre director, filmmaker, actor and producer. (born 1944)
- October 9: Wilfried Martens, 77, 60th and 62nd Prime Minister of Belgium. (born 1936)
- October 11
  - María de Villota, 33, Spanish racing driver. (born 1980)
  - Erich Priebke, 100, German SS captain and war criminal. (born 1913)
- October 14: Bruno Metsu, 59, French footballer and football manager. (born 1954)
- October 15: Rudolf Friedrich, 90, member of the Swiss Federal Council. (born 1923)
- October 23: Anthony Caro, 89, English abstract sculptor. (born 1924)
- October 24: Manolo Escobar, 82, Spanish singer. (born 1931)
- October 28: Tadeusz Mazowiecki, 86, 1st Prime Minister of Poland. (born 1927)
- October 30: Anca Petrescu, 64, chief architect of the Romanian Palace of the Parliament. (born 1949)

=== November ===
- November 12: John Tavener, 69, British composer. (born 1944)
- November 15: Glafcos Clerides, 94, 4th President of Cyprus. (born 1919)
- November 17: Doris Lessing, 94, British Nobel novelist. (born 1919)
- November 19: Frederick Sanger, 95, British Nobel biochemist. (born 1918)
- November 25: Bill Foulkes, 81, English footballer. (born 1932)
- November 28: Mitja Ribičič, 94, Slovene politician, 25th Prime Minister of Yugoslavia. (born 1919)

=== December ===
- December 1: Heinrich Boere, 92, Dutch-German Nazi war criminal. (born 1921)
- December 7: Édouard Molinaro, 85, French film director and screenwriter. (born 1928)
- December 8: John Cornforth, 96, Australian-British Nobel chemist. (born 1917)
- December 14: Peter O'Toole, 81, British actor. (born 1932)
- December 18: Ronnie Biggs, 84, British criminal. (born 1929)
- December 23: Mikhail Kalashnikov, 94, Russian general and small arms designer. (born 1919)
- December 26: Marta Eggerth, 101, Hungarian silent film actress. (born 1912)
- December 29: Wojciech Kilar, 81, Polish composer. (born 1932)
- December 30: Eero Mäntyranta, 76, Finnish skier. (born 1937)

== Sports ==
- January 11–January 27: The 23rd World Men's Handball Championship was held in Spain.
- January 16–January 19: 81st edition of Monte Carlo Rally
- May 4–May 26: 96th edition of Giro d'Italia
- June 29–July 21: 100th edition of Tour de France
- August 10–August 18: The 14th edition of the World Athletics Championships will be held in Moscow, Russia.
- September 4–September 22: The 38th edition of the EuroBasket championship will be held in Slovenia.
- September 6–September 14: The 29th edition of the Women's European Volleyball Championship will be held in Germany and Switzerland.
- December 7–December 22: The 21st edition of the World Women's Handball Championship will be held in Serbia.

== Arts and entertainment ==
- February 1–February 14: Carnival of Venice
- March 9: Robin Stjernberg won the 53rd edition of Melodifestivalen with the song "You".
- February 17: "Child's Pose", directed by Călin Peter Netzer and starring Luminița Gheorghiu in the central role, won the Golden Bear for best picture at the Berlin film festival.
- May 18: Emmelie de Forest of Denmark wins the 58th edition of Eurovision Song Contest with the song "Only Teardrops".
- May 15–May 26: 66th Cannes Film Festival
- June 20–June 29: 54th Moscow International Film Festival
- August 28–September 7: 70th Venice International Film Festival

== Architecture ==
- Library of Birmingham, the largest public library in the UK, projected for completion.
- Mercury City Tower (Moscow), the tallest building in Europe, projected for completion.
- Tour Majunga (Paris), the third tallest skyscraper in France, projected for completion.

== Nobel Prizes ==

- Chemistry – Martin Karplus, Michael Levitt, and Arieh Warshel
- Economics – Eugene Fama, Lars Peter Hansen and Robert J. Shiller
- Literature – Alice Munro
- Peace – Organisation for the Prohibition of Chemical Weapons
- Physics – François Englert and Peter Higgs
- Physiology or Medicine – James E. Rothman, Randy W. Schekman, and Thomas C. Südhof

== Major religious holidays ==
- January 6: Baptism of Jesus, commonly known as Epiphany
- February 1: Imbolc, a Cross-quarter day
- February 13: Ash Wednesday
- March 20: Spring equinox, also known as Ostara
- March 24: Palm Sunday
- March 29: Good Friday
- March 31: Easter (celebrated by the Western Christianity)
- May 1: Beltane, a Cross-quarter day
- May 5: Easter (celebrated by the Eastern Christianity)
- May 9: Feast of the Ascension (celebrated by the Western Christianity)
- May 19: Pentecost (celebrated by the Western Christianity)
- June 21: Summer solstice, also known as Midsummer
- July 9: Ramadan, Muslims holy month of fasting begins
- August 1: Lammas, a Cross-quarter day
- August 7: Eid al-Fitr, Muslims end of fasting celebration
- August 15: Assumption of Mary, preceded by two weeks of fasting
- September 8: Nativity of the Theotokos
- September 22: Autumn equinox, also known as Mabon
- October 15: Eid al-Adha
- November 1
  - Samhain, a Cross-quarter day
  - All Saints' Day/All Souls' Day
- December 1: Advent begins
- December 21: Winter solstice, also known as Yule
- December 25: Nativity of Jesus, commonly known as Christmas

== See also ==
- 2013 in the European Union
- List of state leaders in 2013 § Europe
