= Hôtel de Ville, Brétigny-sur-Orge =

Town hall in Brétigny-sur-Orge, France

Hôtel de Ville
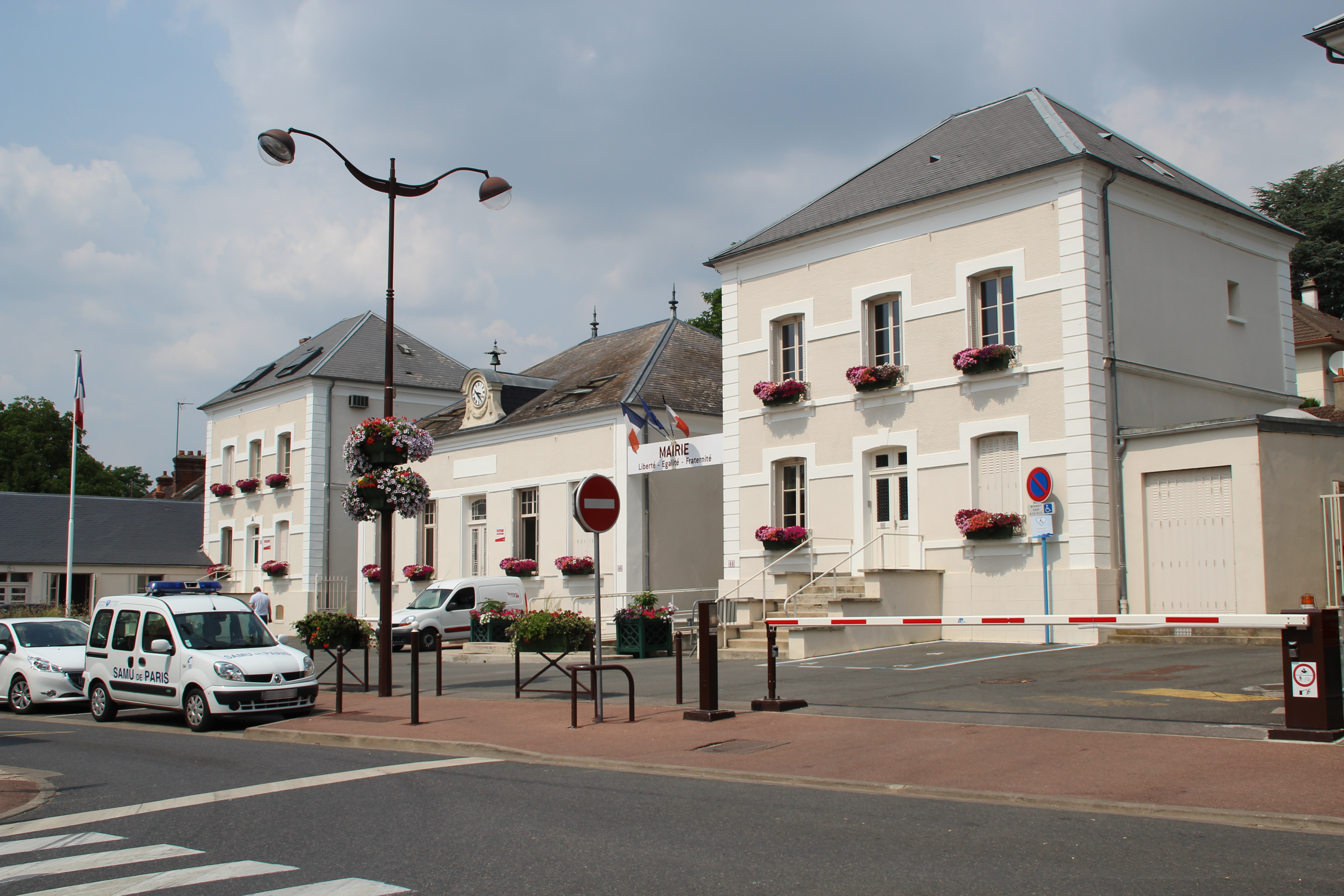
- The main frontage of the Hôtel de Ville in July 2013
- Interactive map of the Hôtel de Ville area

General information
- Type: City hall
- Architectural style: Neoclassical style
- Location: Brétigny-sur-Orge, France
- Coordinates: 48.6114°N 2.3060°E
- Completed: 1864

Design and construction
- Architect: Sieur Richard

The Hôtel de Ville (French pronunciation: [otɛl də vil], City Hall) is a municipal building in Brétigny-sur-Orge, Essonne, in the southern suburbs of Paris, standing on Rue de la Mairie.

== History ==
Following the French Revolution, the town council initially met in the local church or in the house of the mayor at the time. This arrangement continued until the mid-19th century when the town council led by the mayor, Pierre Jules Marquis, decided to commission a municipal building. The site they selected, on the northeast side of Les Sables (now Rue de la Mairie), was purchased from Michel-Antoine Privé for FFr1,112. Construction of the new building started in 1862. It was designed by Sieur Richard from Arpajon in the neoclassical style, built in ashlar stone at a cost of FFr19,772 and was completed in 1864.

The original design involved a single-storey block of five bays facing onto the street. The central bay featured a segmental-headed doorway with a clock at roof level. The outer bays were fenestrated by casement windows. Internally, the building accommodated the mayor's parlour, the town secretary's office, the Salle du Conseil (council chamber), the municipal archives and the local police constable's residence. When Marquis died in July 1887, he left 200,000 gold francs to the town and another 60,000 gold francs to the local benefits office to support local people in need. In recognition of his generosity, a marble plaque was installed in the town hall.

After the Second World War, following significant population growth, the building was extended by the addition of a pair of two-storey wings. These wings were separate from the original building, and a new glass-roofed reception area was installed in the space between the original building and the right hand wing at a cost of €1.2 million in 2024. The opportunity was also taken to renovate the main public reception room, the Salle des Républiques. The new reception area was officially opened by the mayor, Nicolas Méary, in March 2025.
