= 2013 Prague explosion =

Blast caused by a natural gas leak

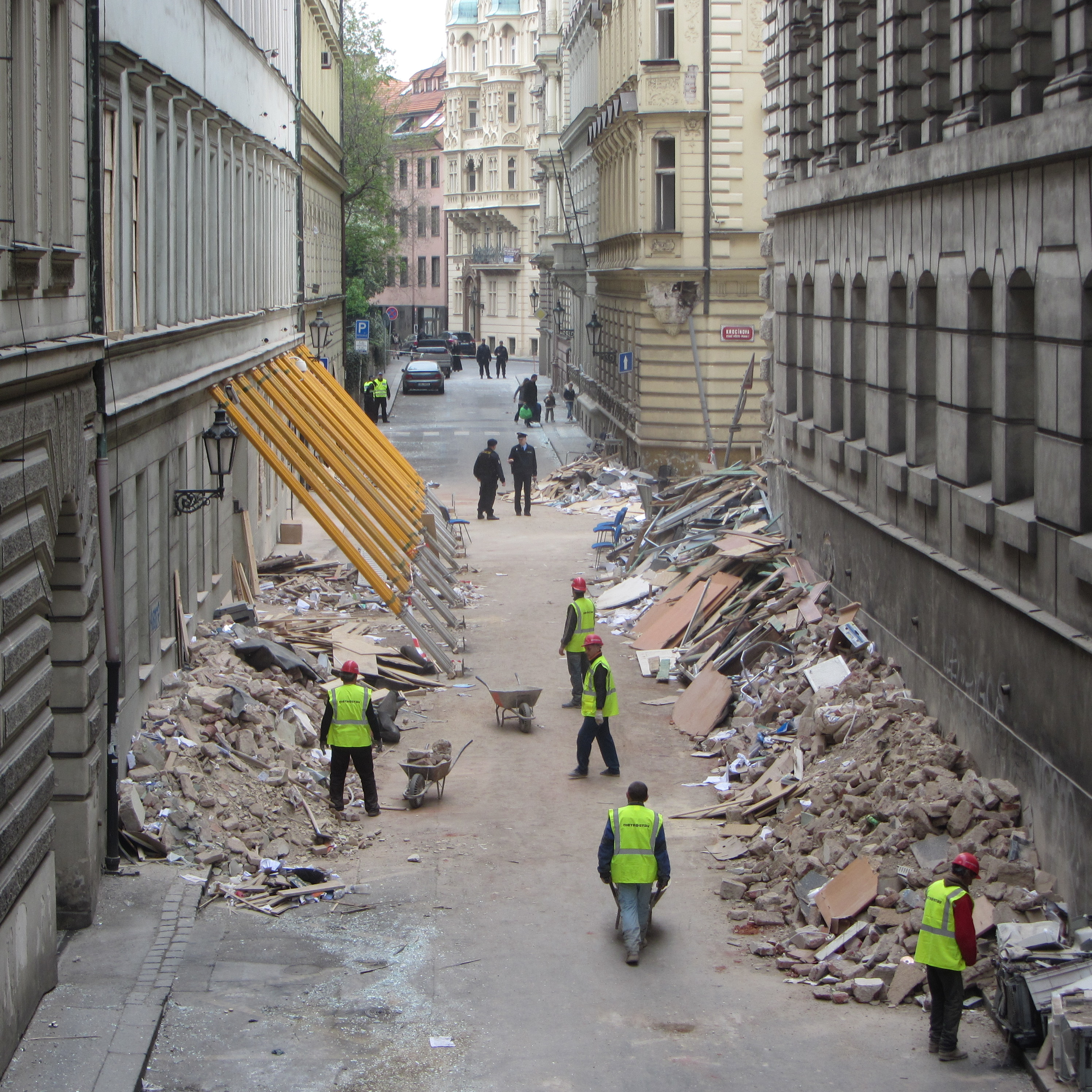
- Divadelní street in Prague's Old Town following the explosion.
- Date: 29 April 2013
- Location: Divadelní 334/5, Prague, Czech Republic; 50°04′55.5″N 14°24′48.3″E
- Injuries: 43

On April 29, 2013 at around 10:00am CEST (8:00 UTC), an explosion occurred in a building in the centre of Prague, Czech Republic. The incident occurred in a townhouse belonging to the Air Navigation Services of the Czech Republic on Divadelní street in Old Town, Prague 1, close to the Academy of Sciences and National Theatre. The blast could be heard across the whole city centre, as far away as Prague Castle, 1.4 km (1 mi) away from the incident. While there were no fatalities, 43 people were injured by the blast, one seriously. The resulting shock wave from the blast damaged windows in nearby buildings including the National Theatre, Café Slavia, the Film and TV School of the Academy of Performing Arts in Prague (FAMU), the Faculty of Social Sciences of Charles University and the Academy of Sciences of the Czech Republic.

The blast was caused by a natural gas leak. According to a head of the Prague Fire Service, gas could be smelled in the area following in the blast, causing risk of further explosions.

The explosion was captured on CCTV (video)
