= Brétigny-sur-Orge =

Commune in Île-de-France, France

- Commune
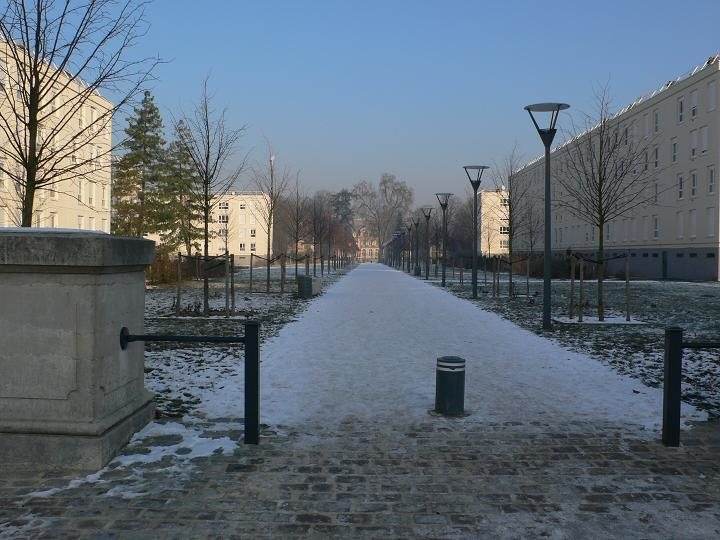
- The residential zone of La Fontaine and the eponymous castle in the background.

- Coat of arms

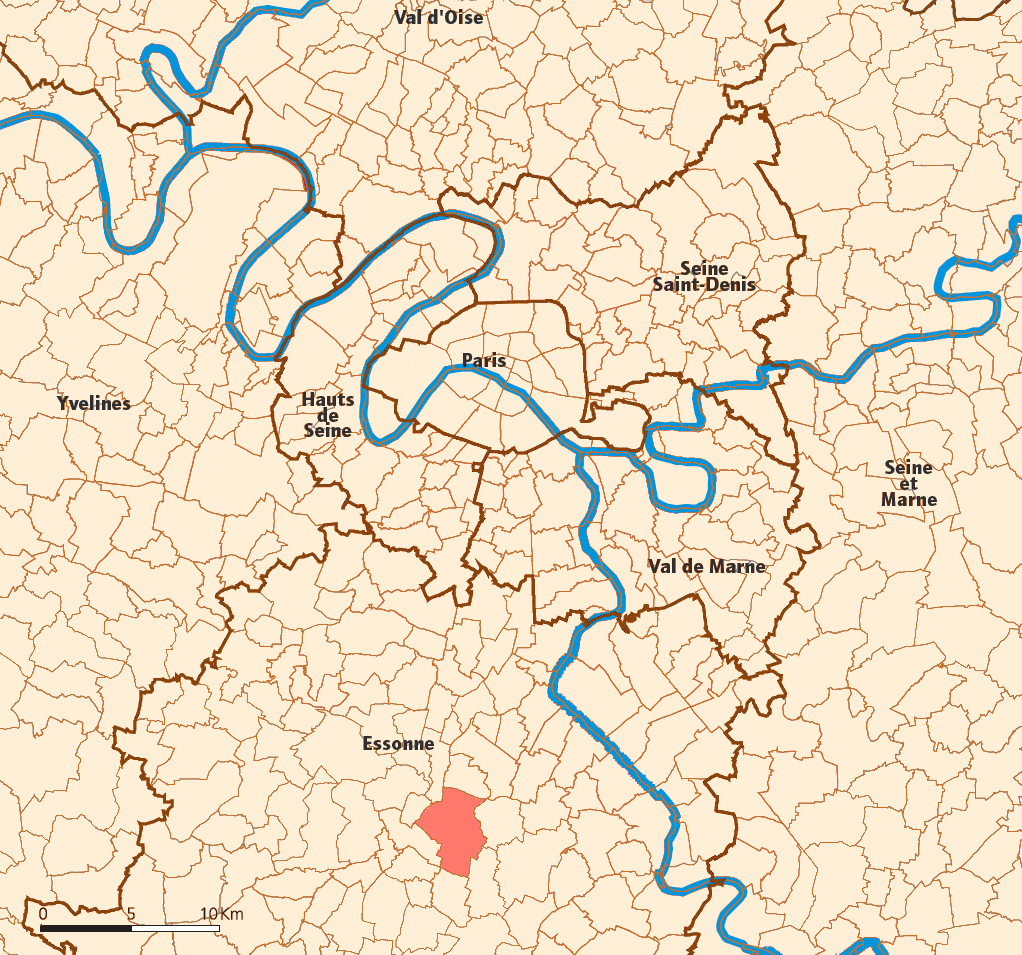
- Location (in red) within Paris inner and outer suburbs
- Location of Brétigny-sur-Orge
- Location within France Location within Île-de-France (region)
- Coordinates: 48°36′41″N 2°18′21″E
- Country: France
- Region: Île-de-France
- Department: Essonne
- Arrondissement: Palaiseau
- Canton: Brétigny-sur-Orge
- Intercommunality: CA Cœur d'Essonne

Government
  - Mayor (2020–2026): Nicolas Méary
- Area^{1}: 14.56 km^{2} (5.62 sq mi)
- Highest elevation: 97 m (318 ft)
- Lowest elevation: 41 m (135 ft)
- Population (2023): 26,658
  - Density: 1,831/km^{2} (4,742/sq mi)
- Time zone: UTC+01:00 (CET)
  - Summer (DST): UTC+02:00 (CEST)
- INSEE/Postal code: 91103 /91220
- ^{1} French Land Register data, which excludes lakes, ponds, glaciers > 1 km^{2} (0.386 sq mi or 247 acres) and river estuaries.

Brétigny-sur-Orge (French pronunciation: [bʁetiɲi syʁ ɔʁʒ], literally Brétigny on Orge) is a commune in the southern suburbs of Paris, France, 26.7 km (16.6 mi) from the city center.

== Origin of the city name ==
The name of the settlement is attested as Britiniacum in 1146, as Bretigniacum in 1548, and subsequently as Breteigny.

The origins of Brétigny start in the era of Roman Gaul. The etymology comes from the Latin britiniacum, which means "property of the Breton". The name certifies that this territory was during that period dedicated to a Breton, coming from (Great) Britain, during the period of Briton migration (6th century). Brétigny afterwards belonged to the royal estate of the Merovingian kings (from the 5th century until the 8th century).

At the time of the creation of the commune, the city name was spelled without any accent. This accent was added in 1801, and the name of the river ("on Orge") was added in 1898.

== History ==
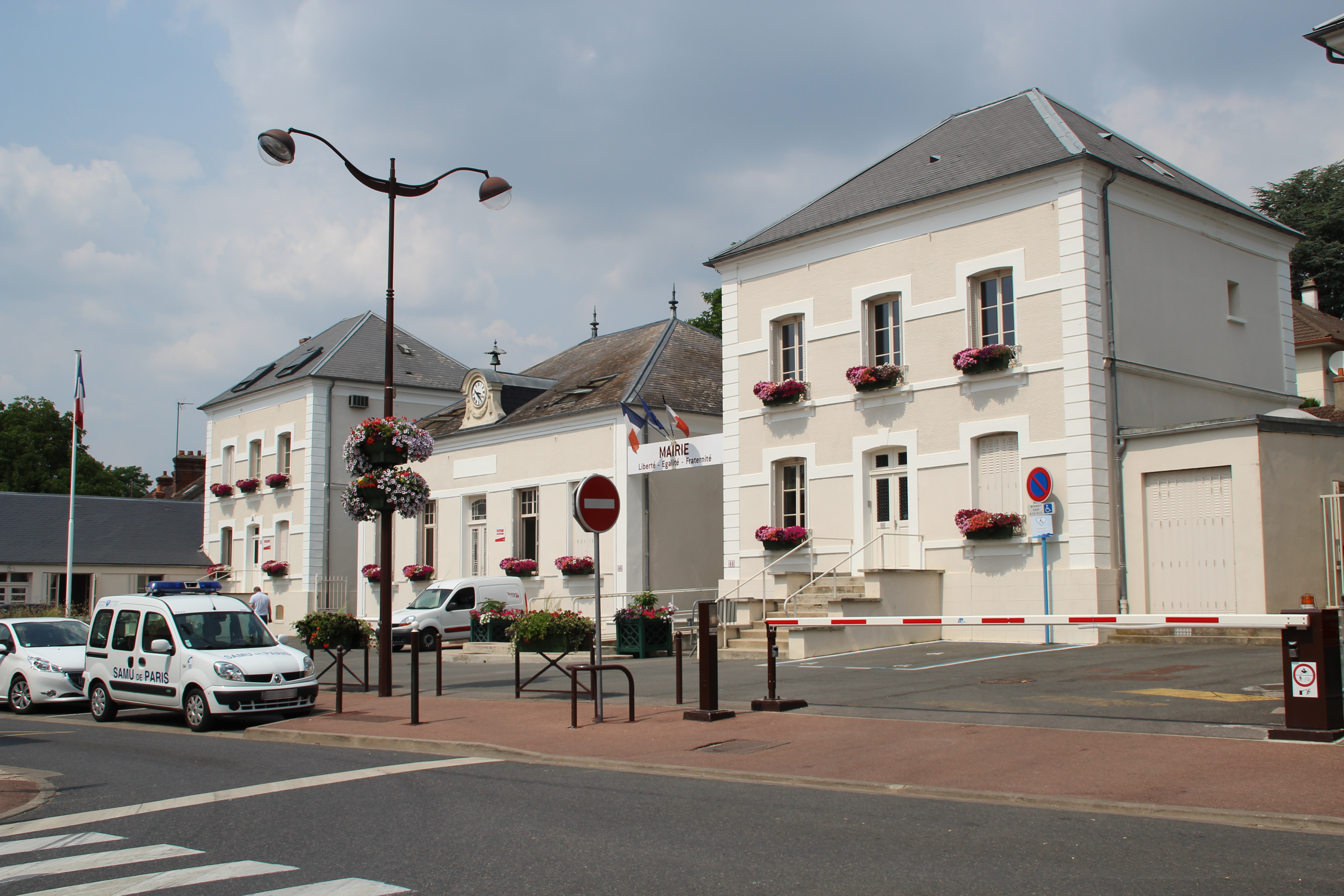
The Hôtel de Ville

The Hôtel de Ville was completed in 1864.

== Geography ==
=== Climate ===
Brétigny-sur-Orge has an oceanic climate (Köppen climate classification Cfb). The average annual temperature in Brétigny-sur-Orge is 11.9 °C (53.4 °F). The average annual rainfall is 628.9 mm (24.76 in) with December as the wettest month. The temperatures are highest on average in July, at around 20.2 °C (68.4 °F), and lowest in January, at around 4.5 °C (40.1 °F). The highest temperature ever recorded in Brétigny-sur-Orge was 42.0 °C (107.6 °F) on 25 July 2019; the coldest temperature ever recorded was −18.8 °C (−1.8 °F) on 16 January 1985.

Climate data for Brétigny-sur-Orge (1991−2020 normals, extremes 1947−present)
Month	Jan	Feb	Mar	Apr	May	Jun	Jul	Aug	Sep	Oct	Nov	Dec	Year
Record high °C (°F)	15.8 (60.4)	20.2 (68.4)	25.3 (77.5)	29.4 (84.9)	32.0 (89.6)	37.3 (99.1)	42.0 (107.6)	39.7 (103.5)	34.4 (93.9)	30.3 (86.5)	22.1 (71.8)	16.8 (62.2)	42.0 (107.6)
Mean daily maximum °C (°F)	7.2 (45.0)	8.5 (47.3)	12.6 (54.7)	16.2 (61.2)	19.8 (67.6)	23.4 (74.1)	26.0 (78.8)	25.9 (78.6)	21.8 (71.2)	16.6 (61.9)	10.9 (51.6)	7.6 (45.7)	16.4 (61.5)
Daily mean °C (°F)	4.5 (40.1)	5.0 (41.0)	8.1 (46.6)	10.9 (51.6)	14.5 (58.1)	17.9 (64.2)	20.2 (68.4)	20.0 (68.0)	16.4 (61.5)	12.4 (54.3)	7.7 (45.9)	4.9 (40.8)	11.9 (53.4)
Mean daily minimum °C (°F)	1.7 (35.1)	1.5 (34.7)	3.6 (38.5)	5.7 (42.3)	9.2 (48.6)	12.5 (54.5)	14.4 (57.9)	14.1 (57.4)	11.0 (51.8)	8.2 (46.8)	4.5 (40.1)	2.2 (36.0)	7.4 (45.3)
Record low °C (°F)	−18.8 (−1.8)	−17.0 (1.4)	−10.7 (12.7)	−4.7 (23.5)	−1.9 (28.6)	1.4 (34.5)	3.8 (38.8)	3.7 (38.7)	0.2 (32.4)	−4.5 (23.9)	−9.6 (14.7)	−16.4 (2.5)	−18.8 (−1.8)
Average precipitation mm (inches)	48.2 (1.90)	44.9 (1.77)	45.0 (1.77)	44.6 (1.76)	61.4 (2.42)	55.6 (2.19)	53.1 (2.09)	57.7 (2.27)	48.6 (1.91)	52.6 (2.07)	54.5 (2.15)	62.7 (2.47)	628.9 (24.76)
Average precipitation days (≥ 1.0 mm)	10.0	9.7	9.0	8.4	9.1	8.7	7.2	7.6	7.6	9.8	10.6	11.8	109.5
Source: Météo-France

== Transport ==
It is served by Brétigny station on Paris RER line C.

On 12 July 2013 an intercity train derailed shortly after 17.00, killing 7 people.

== Population ==
Inhabitants of Brétigny-sur-Orge are known as Brétignolais in French.

Historical population

Year	Pop.	±% p.a.
1793	700	—
1821	792	+0.44%
1846	830	+0.19%
1872	1,093	+1.06%
1901	1,251	+0.47%
1906	1,329	+1.22%
1911	1,438	+1.59%
1921	2,205	+4.37%
1926	2,640	+3.67%
1931	3,076	+3.10%
1936	3,300	+1.42%
1946	3,673	+1.08%

Year	Pop.	±% p.a.
1954	4,759	+3.29%
1962	6,830	+4.62%
1968	12,688	+10.87%
1975	19,572	+6.39%
1982	18,662	−0.68%
1990	19,671	+0.66%
1999	21,650	+1.07%
2007	22,837	+0.67%
2012	25,214	+2.00%
2017	26,528	+1.02%
2023	26,658	+0.08%

Source: EHESS and INSEE (1968-2023)

== Education ==
Preschools include:

- École Jacqueline Auriol
- École Joliot Curie
- École Eugénie Cotton
- École Lucien Clause
- École Jean Macé

Elementary schools include:

- École Gabriel Chevrier
- École Jean Jaurès
- École Jean Lurçat
- École Jean Macé
- École Jean Moulin
- École Rosa Parks
- École Langevin Wallon

School groups with both preschool and elementary levels:

- Groupe Scolaire Aimé Césaire
- Groupe Scolaire Claudie Haigneré
- Groupe Scolaire Louise Michel

There are two public junior high schools, Collège Paul Éluard and Collège Pablo Neruda. There is one public senior high school/sixth-form college, Lycée Polyvalent Jean-Pierre Timbaud.

There is a private Catholic school, Établissement Catholique Jeanne d'Arc, which covers preschool to senior high school/sixth-form college.

The Médiathèque de Brétigny-sur-Orge functions as the public library.

== Notable residents ==
- Cédric Collet, footballer, was born in Brétigny. He has played for the Guadeloupe national football team.
- Cédric Baseya, footballer, was born in Brétigny. He has played for Le Havre AC and some English clubs, but is now a free agent.
- Antoine-Gaspard Boucher d'Argis, (1708-1791), lawyer and encyclopedist, lived in Brétigny in the Castle of la Fontaine.
- Jean de Boishue (1943- ), politician. He was mayor of Brétigny.
- Patrice Évra, football player, played for CS Brétigny from 1993 to 1997.
- Jérémy Ménez, football player, played for CS Brétigny from 2000 to 2001.
