= Brétigny-sur-Orge train crash =

2013 public transit disaster in Paris, France

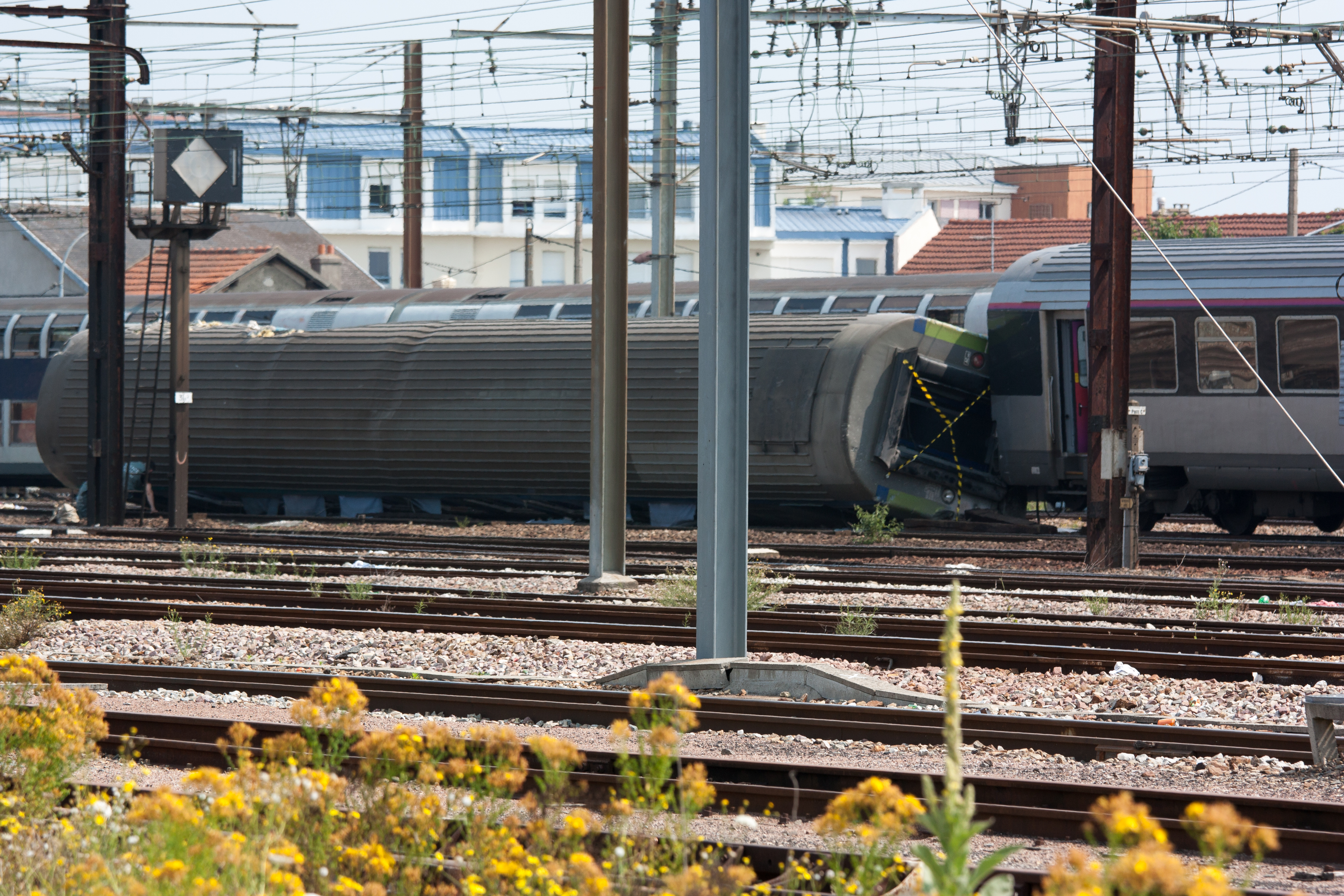
- The derailed 4th carriage of the train that crashed at the Brétigny station

Details
- Date: 12 July 2013; 17:11 CEST (UTC+02:00)
- Location: Brétigny-sur-Orge, Île-de-France
- Coordinates: 48°36′26″N 2°18′08″E
- Country: France
- Operator: SNCF
- Incident type: Derailment
- Cause: Track defect

Statistics
- Trains: 1
- Passengers: 385
- Deaths: 7
- Injured: 428

On 12 July 2013, a train crash in the commune of Brétigny-sur-Orge in the southern suburbs of Paris left seven people dead and 428 injured when a passenger train carrying 385 people derailed and hit the station platform.

The crash resulted from a fault in the rail track.

Until the Eckwersheim derailment 2 years later, which killed 11 people, the crash was the deadliest in France since the 1988 Gare de Lyon accident 25 years prior in which 56 people were killed.

== Accident ==
At 17:11 CEST (15:11 UTC) on 12 July 2013, SNCF Corail Intercités train 3657 from Paris Gare d'Austerlitz to Limoges derailed and crashed at Brétigny station, resulting in the deaths of seven people (three passengers on the train and four on the platform) and injuries to "dozens" more. There were 385 passengers on the train, and the crash occurred a few minutes after the train departed Austerlitz at 16:53. It was scheduled to arrive at Limoges-Bénédictins at 20:05. The trains and platforms at Brétigny were particularly busy as it was rush hour and the Friday before the Bastille Day holiday weekend.

The train was not scheduled to stop and was travelling at 137 km/h (85 mph) at the time of the crash, well below the speed limit of 150 km/h (93 mph). The last four carriages derailed on a double slip, and the train then separated between the fourth and fifth carriages. The rear of the train deviated to the left from Track 1 to Track 3 at the following turnout. With the fifth and seventh carriages following different tracks, the sixth carriage was dragged along the platform between them for a distance of around 100 metres, during which it was pierced by a beam supporting the roof. The fifth carriage first hit the platform on its left and then came to rest along the opposite platform.

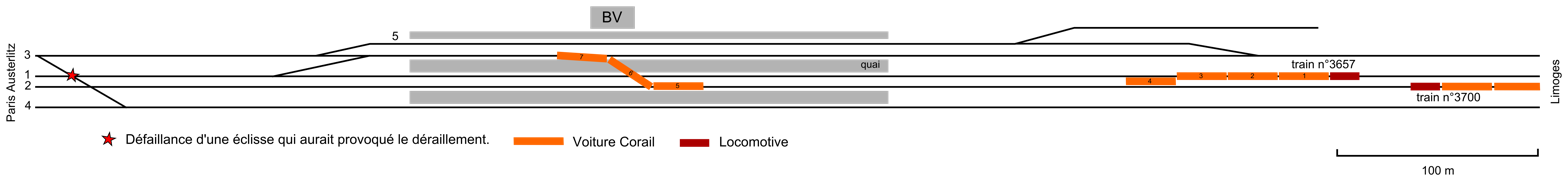
Diagram of the derailment

== Response ==
Railway workers immediately took action, preventing, by a few seconds, a collision between the derailed carriages and another approaching from the opposite direction.

According to a police report, some thefts from passengers and throwing of projectiles at rescue workers occurred shortly after the accident. The Minister of Transport Frédéric Cuvillier and Interior Minister Manuel Valls described the incidents as "isolated acts" and said the throwing of missiles ceased when the police arrived.

== Investigation ==
The SNCF, French Land Transport Accident Investigation Bureau (BEA-TT), and judicial authorities started three separate investigations into the accident.

The SNCF released its initial findings on 13 July 2013, reporting that the derailment appeared to have been caused by a track failure. A steel fishplate connecting two rails came loose 200 metres (660 ft) from the station at a set of switches, and became stuck in them. The last axle of the third carriage is thought to be the first to have hit the fishplate.

In January 2019, an SNCF manager who had been supervising track inspections at Brétigny before the crash was charged with homicide.

== Causes ==
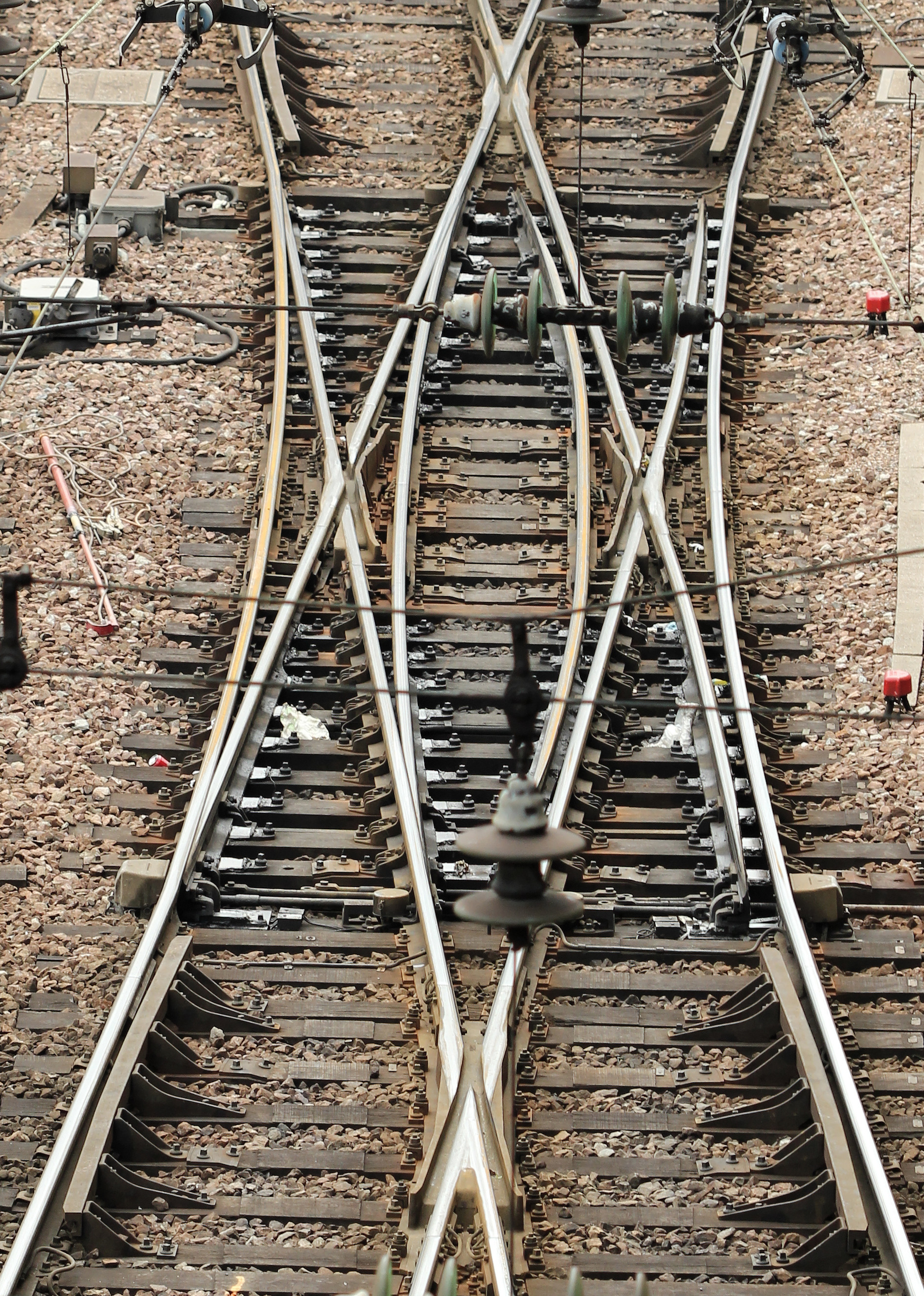
The 4 bolt fishplate involved in the derailment linked the lower right switch (here open) to the frog (the crossing zone). The inner plate swung around the last bolt and blocked the right frog of the double slip.

Three investigations were initiated by the Évry public prosecutor, the Land Transport Accident Investigation Bureau (BEA-TT) of the Ministry of Transport, and the SNCF. The train was believed to have derailed on the approach to Brétigny when passing over a switch 200 metres (660 ft) before the station. The French transport minister Frédéric Cuvillier stated that the accident was not due to human error and ruled out any responsibility on the part of the driver.

An SNCF director said that the failure of a fishplate (rail joint) was the cause of the crash, confirmed in the third SNCF press conference by supporting photographs. According to Guillaume Pepy, the SNCF president, the fishplate broke away from the rails and became lodged in the middle of the switch, causing the derailment.

Pepy said the SNCF considered itself responsible for the lives of its passengers and announced a campaign to check all similar equipment, nearly 5,000 units throughout the network, whose maintenance is within the SNCF's remit.

== Gallery ==
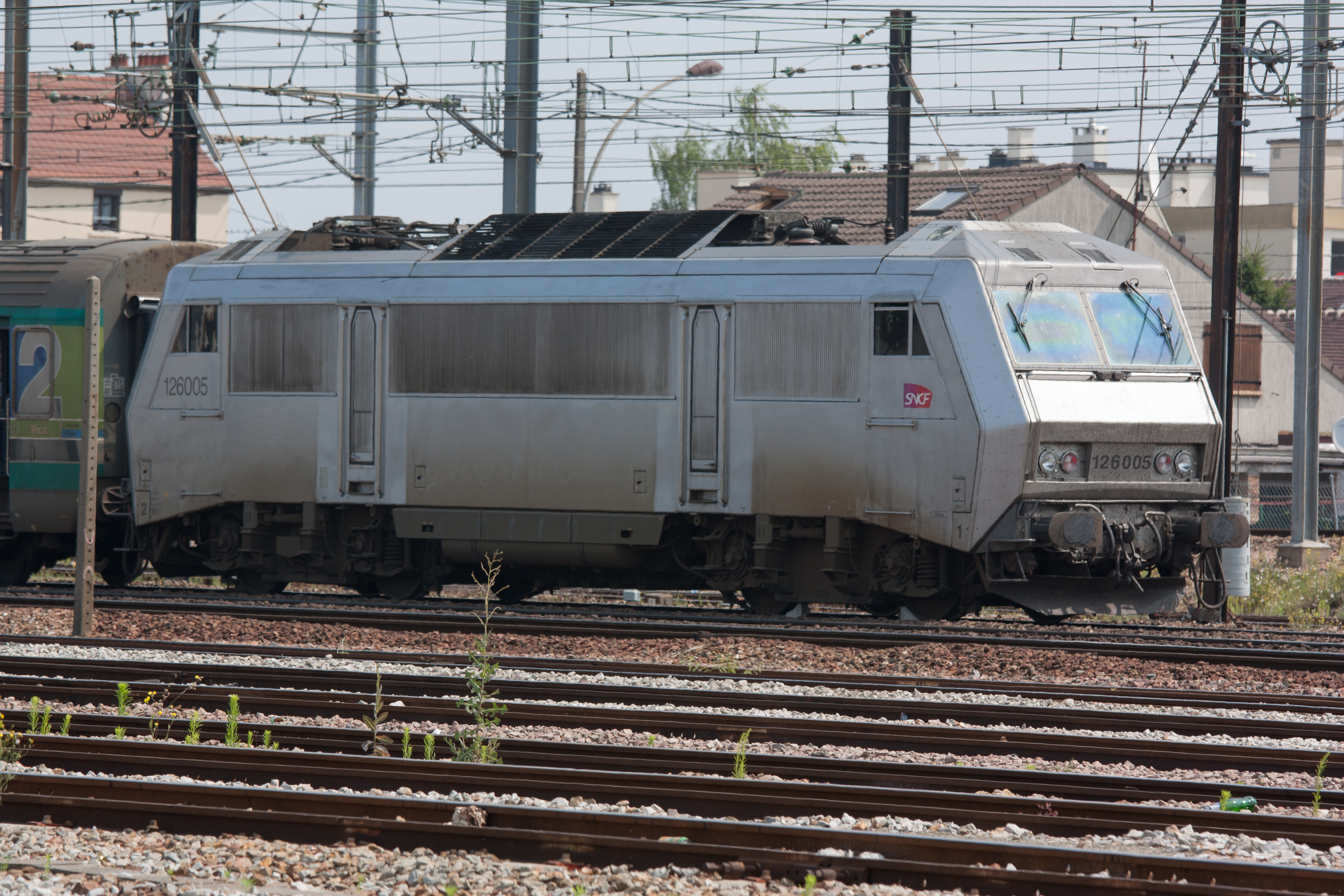
Locomotive BB 26005 in front of train 3657.

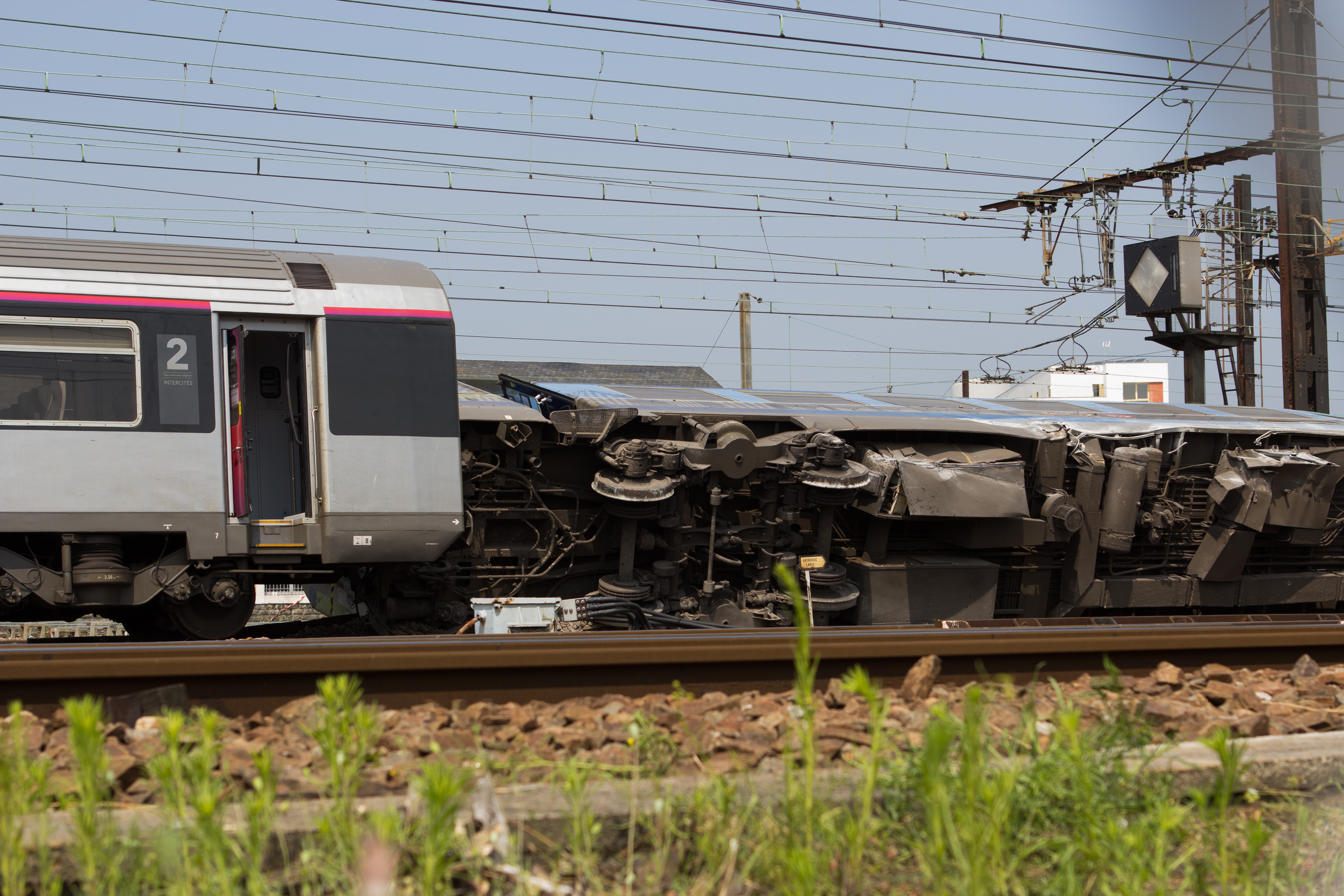
Carriages 3 and 4.

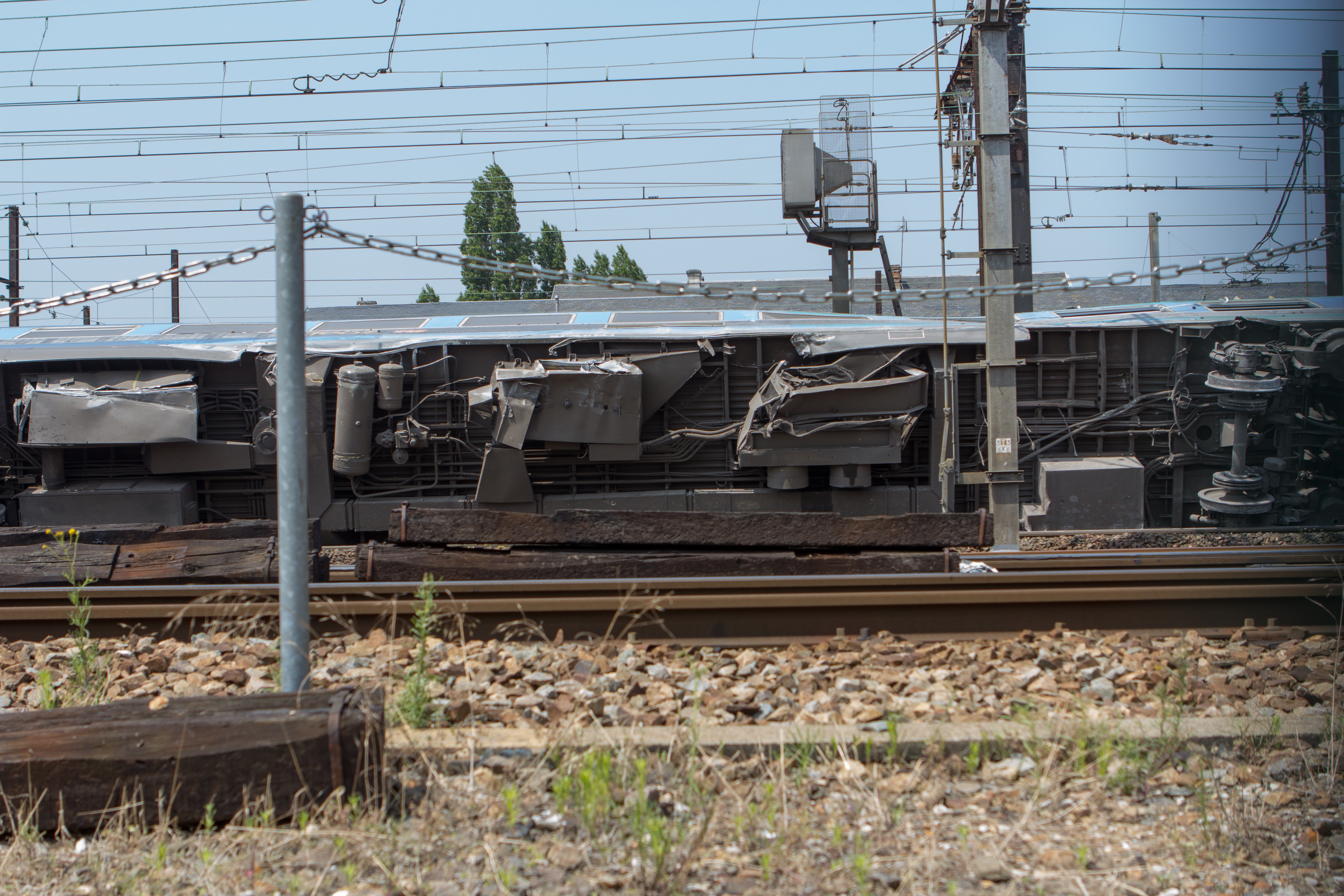
Carriage 4 lying on its side.

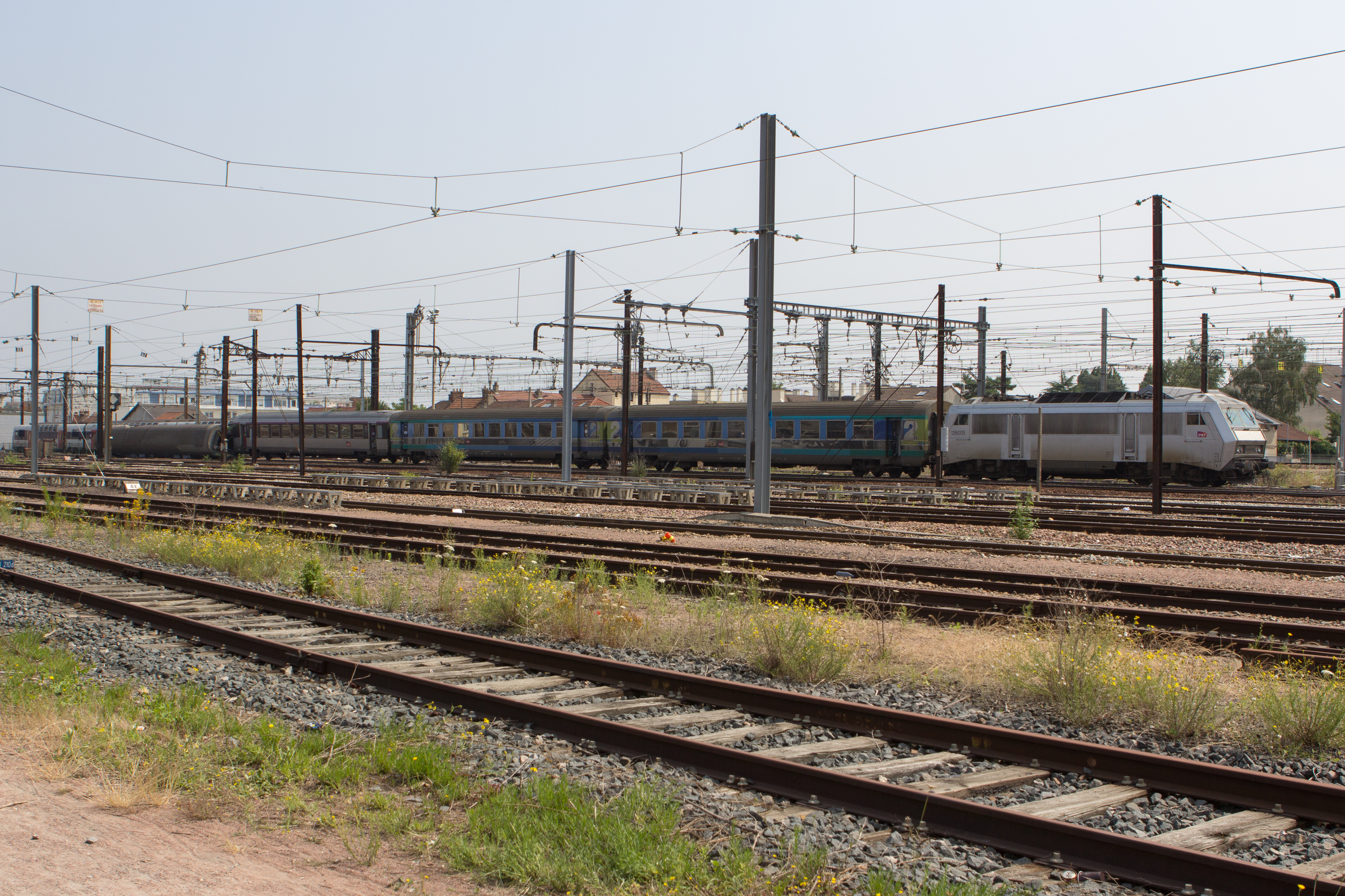
Locomotive and four first carriages of train 3657.

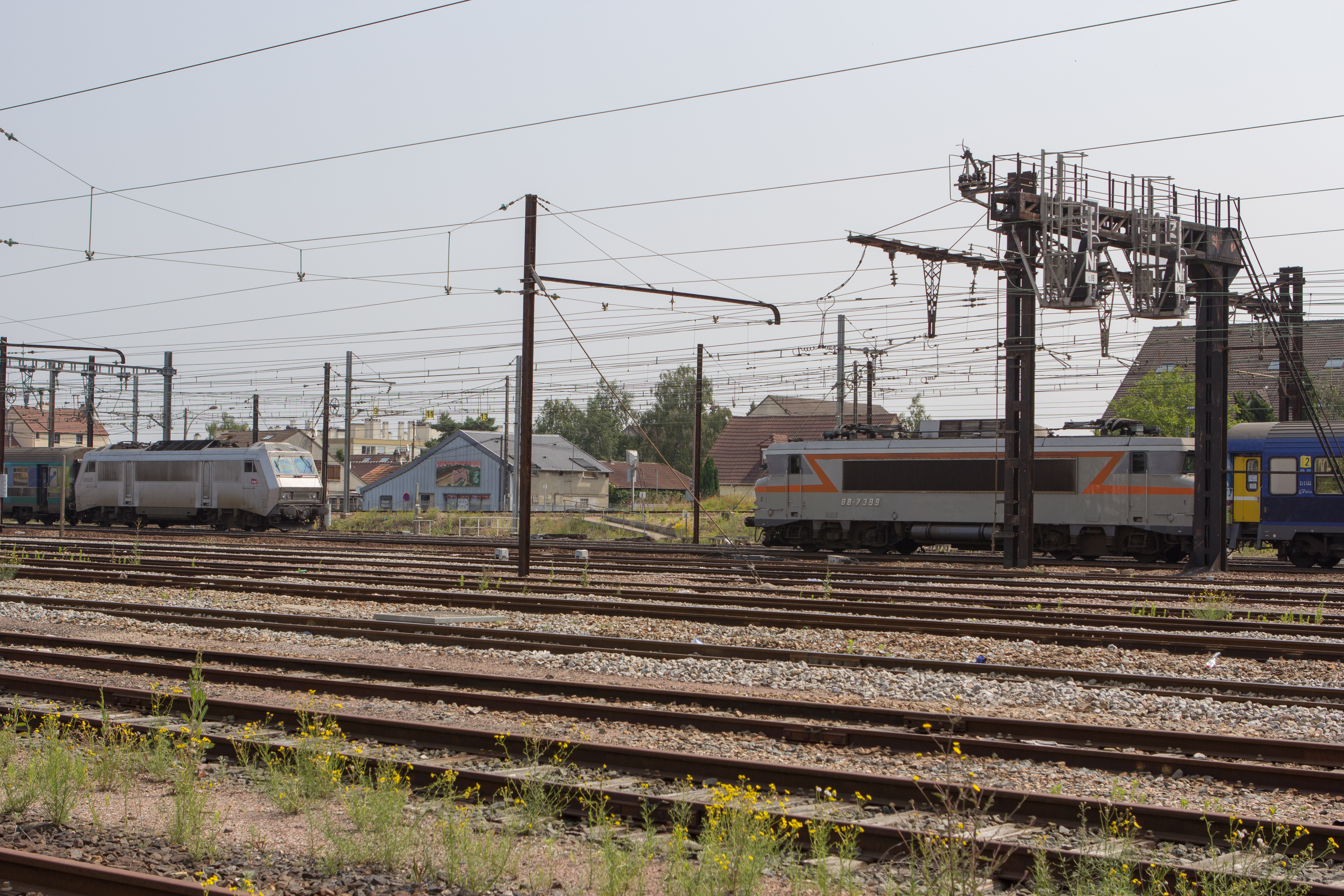
Train 3657 on the left. In the opposite direction, another train stopped just in time.

== See also ==
- Grayrigg derailment (2007)
- Potters Bar derailment (2002)
