= Tailings dam failure =

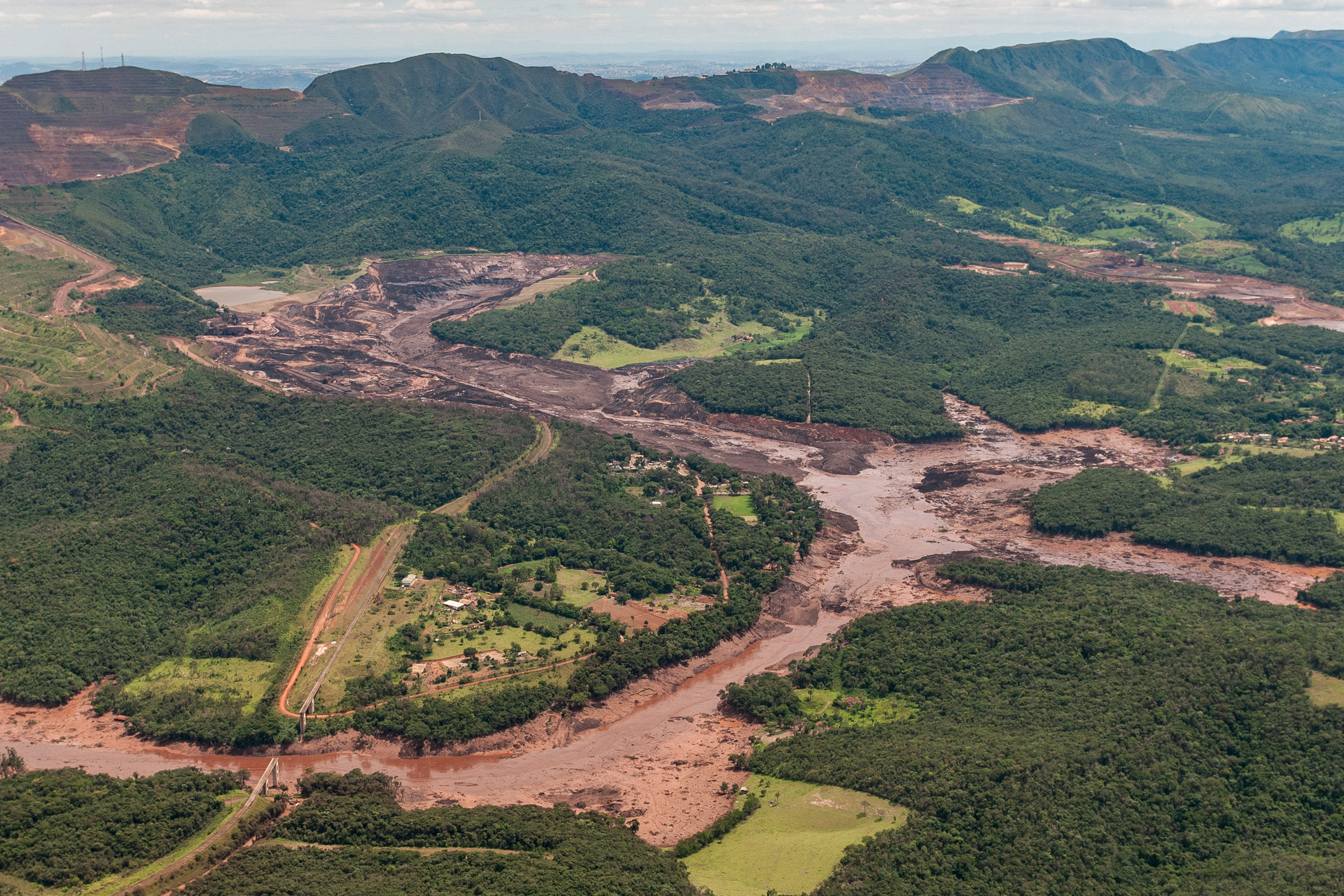
Brumadinho dam disaster in 2019

A tailings dam is a structure that stores mining byproducts, including those that are toxic or radioactive. As a result, the structural failure of tailings dams and the ensuing release of toxic metals into the environment can produce many risks and hazards to an area. The standard of public reporting on tailings dam incidents is poor; a large number remain completely unreported, or lack basic facts when reported. There is no comprehensive database for historic failures. According to mining engineer David M Chambers of the Center for Science in Public Participation, 10,000 years is "a conservative estimate" of how long most tailings dams will need to maintain structural integrity.

== Rate ==
The lack of any comprehensive tailings dam database has prevented meaningful analysis, either gross comparisons (such as country to country comparisons, or tailings dam failures versus hydro dam failure rates) or technical failure analysis to help prevent future incidents. The records are very incomplete on crucial data elements: design height of dam, design footprint, construction type (upstream, downstream, center line), age, design life, construction status, ownership status, capacity, release volume, runout, etc.

An interdisciplinary research report from 2015 recompiled the official global record on tailings dam failures and major incidents and offered a framework for examining the severity and consequence of major incidents. That report shows a correlation between failure rates and the pace of copper ore production, and also establishes a relationship between the pursuit of lower grades of ore, which produces larger volumes of waste, and increasingly severe incidents. For this reason, several programs to make tailing dams more sustainable have been set in motion in countries like Chile, where there are more than 740 spread across the country.

== Environmental damage ==
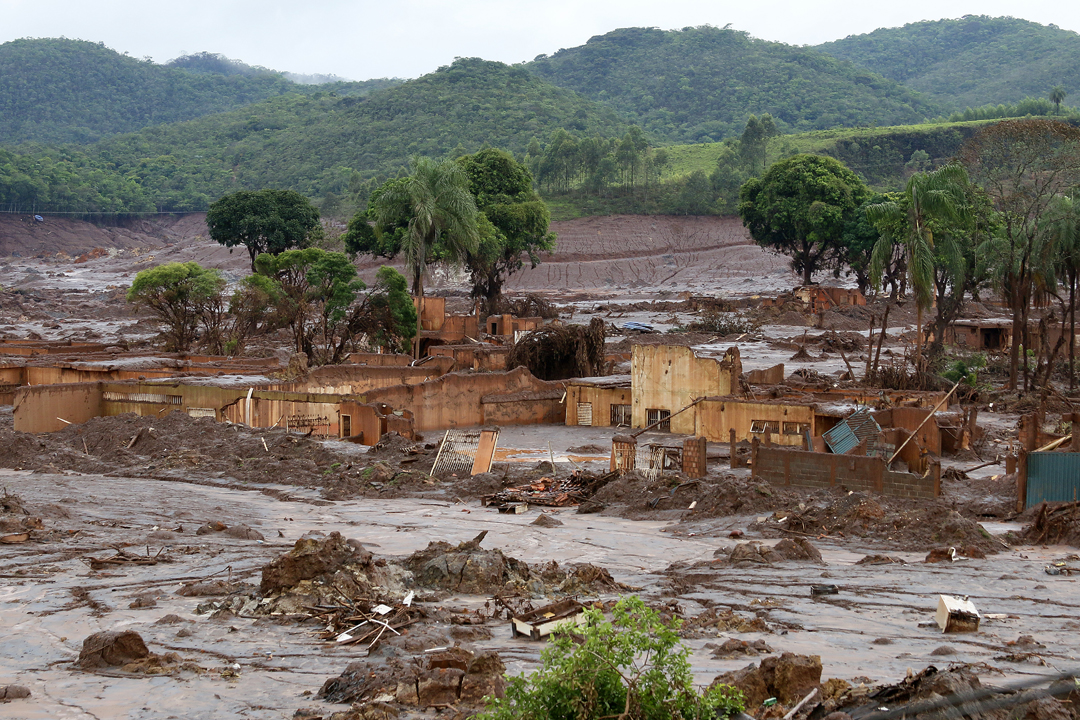
Bento Rodrigues dam disaster, 2015

The mining and processing byproducts collected in tailings dams are not part of the aerobic ecological systems, and are unstable. They may damage the environment by releasing toxic metals (arsenic and mercury among others), by acid drainage (usually by microbial action on sulfide ores), or by damaging aquatic wildlife that rely on clear water.

Tailings dam failures involving significant ecological damage include:

- the Sino-Metals Leach Zambia dam disaster, Zambia in February 2025, when a tailings dam constructed for copper extraction by Sino-Metals Leach Zambia catastrophically failed, dumping approximately 50 million liters of acidic and highly toxic waste into the Kafue River ecosystem, killing riverine ecosystems and impacting the water and irrigation supply of 60% of Zambia's population.
- the Jagersfontein Tailings Dam Collapse, South Africa in September 2022, was a structural failure of a tailings dam used by a stockpile mineral reprocessor, resulting in a mudslide through the town and surrounding farmland.
- the Brumadinho dam disaster, Brazil, 25 January 2019, where as many as 252 people are unaccounted for, and at least 134 are dead. The disaster released 12 million cubic meters of iron waste leading to the Paraopeba River.
- the Bento Rodrigues dam disaster, Brazil, 5 November 2015, considered the worst environmental disaster in Brazil's history, killed 19 people when an iron ore containment dam failed and released 60 million cubic meters of iron waste. It devastated the Rio Doce river over hundreds of kilometers.
- the Mount Polley mine, British Columbia, 4 August 2014, which released 10 million cubic metres of water and 4.5 million cubic metres of metals-laden tailings from a holding reservoir.
- the Ok Tedi environmental disaster in New Guinea, which destroyed the fishery of the Ok Tedi River, continuously from 1984 through 2013
- the Sotkamo metals mine, Finland, 4 November 2012, released "hundreds of thousands of cubic metres" of waste water which raised concentrations of uranium, nickel, and zinc in nearby Snow River, each to at least 10 times the harmful level.
- the Ajka alumina plant accident, Hungary, 4 October 2010, which released one million cubic metres of red mud, a waste product of aluminum refining, flooding the village of Kolontár and killing the Marcal River.
- the Baia Mare cyanide spill, Romania, 30 January 2000, called the worst environmental disaster in Europe since the Chernobyl disaster
- The Doñana disaster, southern Spain, 25 April 1998, which released 4 million-5 million cubic metres of acidic tailings containing heavy metals.
- the Merriespruit tailings dam disaster, South Africa occurred on the night of 22 February 1994 when a tailings dam failed and flooded the suburb of Merriespruit, Virginia. Seventeen people were killed as a result.
- the Church Rock uranium mill spill in New Mexico, 16 July 1979, the largest release of radioactive waste in U.S. history
- three uranium tailings dams near the town of Ak-Tüz, present-day Kyrgyzstan, collapsed in a December 1964 earthquake, releasing 60% of their radioactive volume (600,000 cubic metres (21,000,000 cu ft)) into the Kichi-Kemin River and its agricultural valley
- an incident on 7 April 1961, released 700,000 cubic metres (25,000,000 cu ft) of uranium mine tailings from operations of the Soviet-era Wismut organization into the Zwickauer Mulde River in the village of Oberrothenbach
- the Mailuu-Suu tailings dam failure also in Soviet-era Kyrgyzstan on 16 April 1958, caused the uncontrolled release of 600,000 cubic metres (21,000,000 cu ft) of the radioactive uranium-mine tailings in to spill downstream into a portion of the densely populated Ferghana Valley

Tailings ponds can also be a source of acid drainage, leading to the need for permanent monitoring and treatment of water passing through the tailings dam. For instance in 1994 the operators of the Olympic Dam mine, Western Mining Corporation, admitted that their uranium tailings containment had released of up to 5 million m3 of contaminated water into the subsoil. The cost of mine cleanup has typically been 10 times that of mining industry estimates when acid drainage was involved.

== Casualties ==
The following table of the deadliest known tailings dam failures is not comprehensive, and the casualty figures are estimates.

Dam/incident	Year	Location	Fatalities	Details
1962 Huogudu(火谷都), China tailing pond failure	26 September 1962	Huogudu (火谷都), Gejiu， Yunnan, China	171	Few details available. A tailings pond at a tin mine operated by Yunnan Tin Group collapsed. 368M m^{3} surged. One source reports 171 killed and another 92 injured; another has the date as 26 September.
Mina Plakalnitsa	1 May 1966	Vratsa, Bulgaria	480+	A tailings dam at Plakalnitsa copper mine near the city of Vratsa failed. A total 450,000 cu m of mud and water inundated Vratsa and the nearby village of Zgorigrad, which suffered widespread damage. The official death toll is 107, but the unofficial estimate was more than 480.
Certej dam failure	30 October 1971	Certej Mine, Romania	89	A tailings dam built too tall collapsed, flooding Certeju de Sus with toxic tailings.
Buffalo Creek Flood	26 February 1972	West Virginia, United States	125	Unstable loose constructed dam created by local coal mining company, collapsed in heavy rain. 1,121 injured, 507 houses destroyed, over 4,000 left homeless.
Val di Stava dam	19 July 1985	Tesero, Italy	268	Poor maintenance and low margin for error in design; outlet pipes failed, leading to pressure on dam and sudden collapse. Ten people were ultimately convicted of manslaughter and other charges.
Mufulira	1970	Zambia	89	A tailings reservoir breached and collapsed into the copper mine below it, killing 89 night-shift workers.
Aberfan disaster	21 October 1966	Wales	144	The collapse and landslide of a spoil tip accumulated above the mining town on geologically unstable ground killed 28 adults and 116 children (not an engineered structure)
Hpakant jade mine disaster	25 October 2015	Myanmar	113	A slag heap reportedly used by multiple operators in this jade-mining region became unstable and flooded into nearby residences (not an engineered structure)
El Cobre landslide	28 March 1965	Chile	300	Shaking from a magnitude 7.4 earthquake caused the failure of two tailings dams at the El Soldado copper mine. The resulting flow destroyed the town of El Cobre.
Merriespruit Tailings Dam Failure	22 February 1994	Virginia, Free State, South Africa	17	Merriespruit tailings dam overtopped in heavy rains. The flow of an estimated 600,000 m3 (1.2 Million tonnes) of tailings reached the town of Merriespruit 2 kilometers away. With the seventeen fatal casualties, dozens of homes were engulfed.
Taoshi landslide	8 September 2008	Linfen, Shanxi, China	254+	Iron mine tailings, formerly administered by the state and then put into private hands, collapsed into a village at 8 am.
Bento Rodrigues dam disaster	5 November 2015	Mariana, Minas Gerais, Brazil	19	A tailings dam at an iron ore mine jointly owned by Vale S.A. and BHP and suffered a catastrophic failure releasing around 60 million cubic meters of iron waste into the Doce River which reached the Atlantic Ocean.
Brumadinho dam disaster	25 January 2019	Brumadinho, Minas Gerais, Brazil	259+	A tailings dam at an iron ore mine operated by Vale S.A. suffered a catastrophic failure.

== Largest ==
The following list focuses on the largest tailings dam failures:

Name	Released volume [10^{3} m^{3}]	Date of failure	Country	Environmental consequences	Reservoir volume [10^{3} m^{3}]	Dam type	Notes
Padcal No. 2	80,000; 32,000	1992; 2 January	Philippines	Damaged "large tracts of prime agricultural land"; mine paid penalties to provincial treasury of Pangasinan.	80,000		Copper mine. Dam wall collapsed.
Mariana dam disaster (Bento Rodrigues, Samarco)	60,000; 32,000	2015; 5 November	Brazil	Significant contamination of Rio Doce and Atlantic Ocean.	55,000		Iron ore tailings Flávio Fonseca de Carmo, Luciana Hiromi et al. say 43 × 10^{6} m^{3} of tailings released, which was 80% of the stored volume.
Sino-Metals Leach Zambia dam disaster	50,000	2025 February 18	Zambia	Destruction of riverine and coastal ecosystem up to 100 km (62 mi) downstream.			Copper mining tailings, including concentrated acid, heavy metals, and dissolved solid waste.
Brumadinho dam disaster	12,000	2019 January 25	Brazil	Metals in tailings to be incorporated into rivers' soil.		Earth	Iron ore tailings.
Ajka alumina plant accident	1000	2010 October 4	Hungary	The waste extinguished all life in the Marcal river, alkaline mud reached the Danube			Red mud
Sipalay	30,000	1982; 8 Nov.	Philippines	"Widespread inundation of agricultural land up to 1.5 m high"	37,000		Dam failure, due to slippage of foundation
Mount Polley	15,000; 23,600	2014; 4 August	Canada		74,000		4.5 Mm^{3} water, 10 Mm^{3} metals-laden tailings, plus interstitial water in tailings.
American Cyanamid	11,400	1962	U.S.A.	Acidic water flowed into a wetland called Hooker's Prairie. It was contained there and limed before discharge into South Prong of Alafia River.			Phosphate, Florida.
Padcal No. 3	5,000–10,000	2012; 3 August	Philippines	Balog and Agno Rivers heavily polluted.	250,000; 102,000		Copper mine
Pinchi Lake	6,000–8,000	2004; 30 Nov	Canada	Tlatzen First Nation alleges mercury has destroyed fishery in the lake.			Mercury mine waste containment dam collapses.
Payne Creek Mine	6,800	1994; 2 Oct	U.S.A.				Water from a clay settling pond. Majority of release contained on adjacent mining area; 500,000 m^{3} escaped into a creek
Doñana disaster	4,500; 6,800	1998; 25 April	Spain		15,000		Acidic tailings containing heavy metals
Omai mine	4,200	1995; 19 August	Guyana		5,250		Gold mine. Tailings release contained cyanide.
Kingston power plant	4,100	2008; 22 Dec	U.S.A.	Heavy metals; large fish kill; town inundated;			Fly ash slurry from a coal-fired power plant.
Balka Cuficheva	3,500	1981; 20 January	Soviet Union		27,000		Iron.
Los Cedros	1,500–3,000	1937; 27 May	Mexico	> 300 human fatalities	25,000 (estimate)		Silver and gold mine.
Quinette, Maemot	2,500	1985	Canada	River valley filled with waste for 2.5 km.			Coal mine.
Rio Pomba Cataguases	2,000	2007; 10 January	Brazil				Bauxite (Aluminum) mine
Tyrone, New Mexico	2,000	1980; 13 Oct	U.S.A.	Tailings flow 8 km downstream and inundate farmland.			Copper mine.
Hopewell Mine	1,900	1994; 19 Nov	U.S.A.	Spill into wetlands and Alafia River			Water from a clay settling pond
Merriespruit	690	1994; 22 February	South Africa	Slurry travelled 2 km, covering about 1/2 km^{2}. 17 fatalities.	7,040		Gold mine.
2008 Shanxi mudslide		2008	China				
