= Mining industry of Romania =

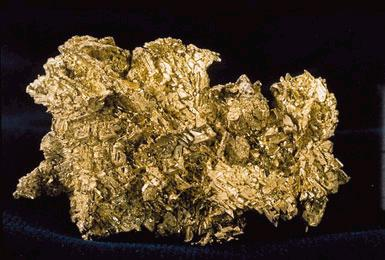
Romania has the largest gold deposit in continental Europe.

Romania ranks tenth in the world in terms of the diversity of minerals produced in the country. Around 60 different minerals are currently produced in Romania. The richest mineral deposits in the country are halite (sodium chloride).

Other natural resources include: coal, iron ore, copper, chromium, uranium, antimony, mercury, gold, barite, borate, celestine (strontium), emery, feldspar, limestone, magnesite, marble, perlite, pumice, pyrites (sulfur) and clay.

Roșia Montană area is the largest gold deposit in continental Europe, estimated at over 300 tons of gold and 1,600 tons of silver, having a value of $3 billion.

== Conflicts ==
Mining projects in Romania have resulted in environmental conflicts, resulting in the cancellation of some high-profile projects. For example, development of the Roșia Montană Project was cancelled, after widespread protests in 2013. In 2016, the owner of that project, Gabriel Resources sought $4.4 billion in damages from Romania at the World Bank, claiming that Romania unfairly blocked the company's $2 billion project.

The Rovina mine was also opposed by environmental and environmental justice groups. That project was stalled in 2021.

Anti-mining organisations have attempted to ban gold cyanidation in Romania, because this process has resulted in environmental disasters, such as the 1971 Certej dam failure and the Baia Mare cyanide spill in 2000.

=== Baia Mare cyanide spill ===
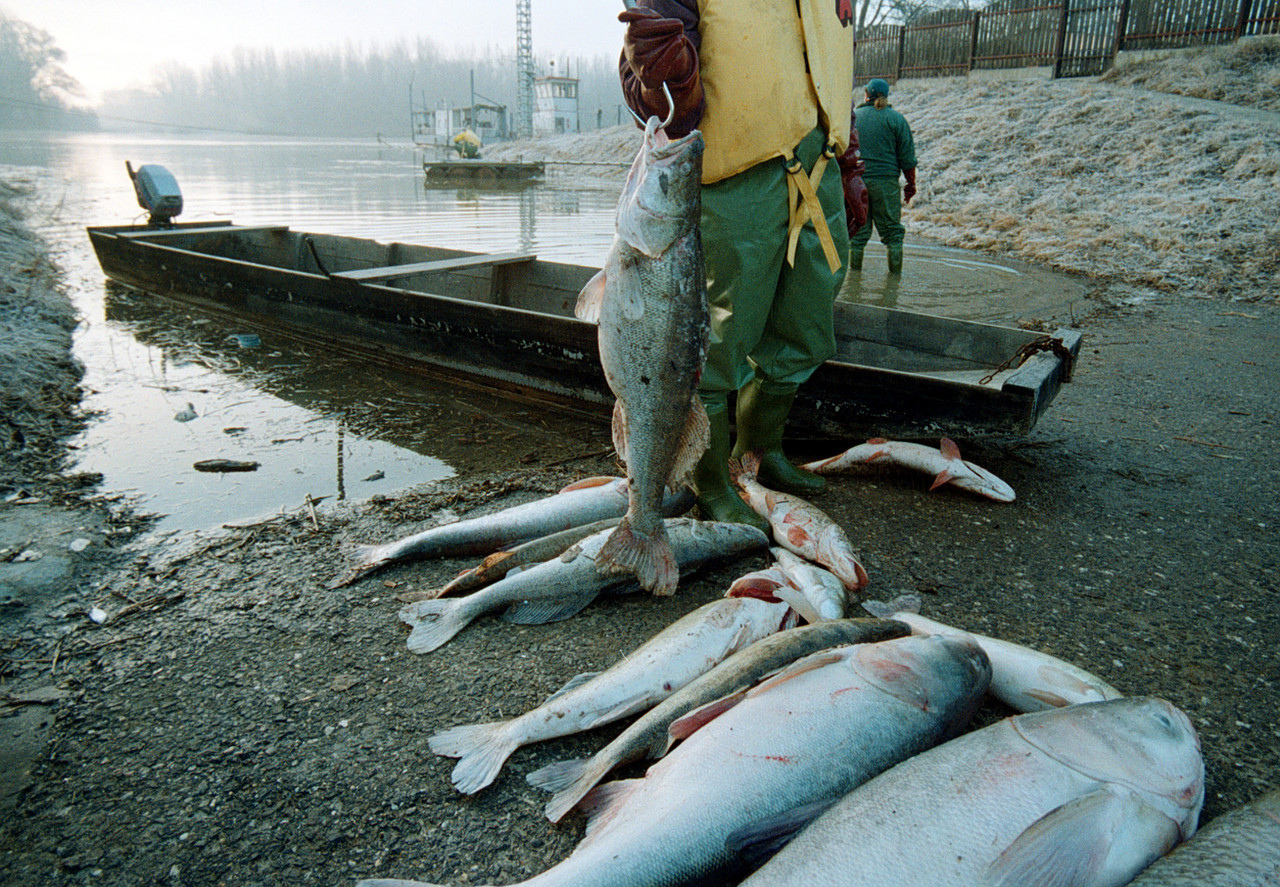
Dead fish in the Tisza River

The 2000 Baia Mare cyanide spill was a leak of cyanide near Baia Mare, Romania, into the Someș River by the gold mining company Aurul, a joint-venture of the Australian company Esmeralda Exploration and the Romanian government.

The polluted waters eventually reached the Tisza River and then the Danube, killing large numbers of fish in Hungary, Serbia, and Romania. The spill has been called the worst environmental disaster in Europe since the Chernobyl disaster.

== Production ==
Romania's mineral production is adequate to supply its manufacturing output. Energy needs are also met by importing bituminous and anthracite coal and crude petroleum. In 2007 approximately 13.4 million tons of anthracite coal, approximately 4,000 tons of tungsten, 565,000 tons of iron ore, and 47,000 tons of zinc ore were mined. Lesser amounts of copper, lead, molybdenum, gold, silver, kaolin, and fluorite also were mined.

In 2004, according to Europaworld.com, the main mining industries in thousand metric tons were:

- brown coal (including lignite): 31,592
- crude petroleum: 5,465
- iron ore: 275
- copper 786.8
- lead concentrates: 15
- zinc concentrates: 18.6
- salt (unrefined): 2,398
- natural gas (million cubic meters): 13,290

== Related industries ==
Romania is an oil producer, but the level of production is not enough to make the country self-sufficient. As a result, it is a net oil and gas importer.

The pipeline network in Romania included: 1,738 km for crude oil, 2,321 km for petroleum products and 708 km for natural gas, in 1999. Several major new pipelines are planned, especially the Nabucco Pipeline for Caspian oilfields, the longest one in the world.
