= Certej =

Certej may refer to several places in Romania:

- Certeju de Sus, a commune in Hunedoara County
- Certeju de Jos, a village in Vorța Commune, Hunedoara County
- Certej (river), a tributary of the Mureș in Hunedoara County
