= Gold cyanidation in Romania =

Gold cyanidation is a chemical process for extracting gold from low-grade ore. Used in Romania for decades, the process came into debate following the 2000 Baia Mare cyanide spill and proposal of the Roșia Montană Project, which would create the largest operation for gold extraction using cyanides in Europe.

== Exploitation projects ==
Currently, there is no exploitation project active, but there is one that has its operations suspended temporarily (Baia Mare) and there are two proposed projects (Roșia Montană and Certej). Previously, there were also exploitations in Baia de Arieș (Alba County), Sasar, Suior, Cavnic, Băița, Băiuț (Maramureș County).

There are some ongoing explorations projects operated by Eldorado Gold in Brad, Deva and Muncel (Hunedoara County), in addition to the company's new intended exploitation in Certej.

== Ban attempts ==
In 2005, a number of 12 Greater Romania Party Senators (among which Gheorghe Funar) proposed a law project which banned the usage of cyanides for gold and silver extraction in Roșia Montană. The law was rejected in the Senate in November 2005 and in the Chamber of Deputies in March 2006. The government also opposed it arguing that the law referred to a special case.

A year later, Funar and Peter Eckstein of the Democratic Union of Hungarians in Romania, usually bitter rivals in the political scene of Cluj, created a new law which was more general and avoided to talk about Roșia Montană. The project was nevertheless rejected in the autumn of 2008, meeting the opposition of the Democratic-Liberal Party.

A third attempt to ban gold cyanidation was registered in the Senate in June 2013, proposed by non-affiliated deputy Remus Cernea, being supported by other 38 senators and deputies of all parties, many of which from the government coalition. The only MP from the Democratic-Liberal Party to support the law was the deputy Teodor Paleologu.

== Disasters ==
The 1971 Certej dam failure led to the deaths of 89 people after a failure of the dam of the tailings pond.

The 2000 Baia Mare cyanide spill occurred when a dam (operated by Aurul, a joint-venture of the Australian company Esmeralda Exploration and the Romanian government) holding 100,000 tonnes of cyanide-contaminated tailings spilled into the Someș River and from there into the Tisza and Danube. The spill created a large-scale environmental disaster that has been called the worst environmental disaster in Europe since the Chernobyl disaster.
