= Local Rapid Evaluation of Atmospheric Conditions System =

The Local Rapid Evaluation of Atmospheric Conditions (L-REAC) System was a computerized weather sensor system designed by the U.S. Army Research Laboratory (ARL) that became operational in 2011.

== Purpose ==
The system was designed to warn soldiers and civilians of airborne threats, such as chemical attacks or toxic spills. The purpose of L-REAC was to provide wind monitoring and modeling, which acted as a decision aid for soldiers facing environmental hazards.

== History ==
A research meteorologist at ARL developed the first L-REAC prototype. After conducting a survey of commercially available technology from 2003–2007, ARL identified a need for a local atmospheric assessment system. Three studies conducted at White Sands Missile Range, New Mexico, in the early 2000s revealed a requirement for emergency first responders to have up-to-date atmospheric information on local conditions.

During the mid 2000s, it was also reported that U.S. Army soldiers stationed in Iraq were experiencing toxic fumes while working near burn pits. The L-REAC concept was produced from 2009-2011 at White Sands Missile Range as part of a study investigating the airflow around an urban building and small building clusters.

In June 2017, ARL licensed the technology to Diamond B Technology Solutions in Billings, Montana. Rebranded as LR-x, the system assisted in tracking environmental emergencies, such as wildfire smoke during fire suppression efforts.

== Operation ==
The L-REAC provided 3D weather models that generated wind field and plume outputs, displaying near real-time meteorological data on a map background. The models included terrain and buildings, and displayed danger zones and weather conditions (i.e. wind speed, wind direction, temperature, and relative humidity).
