= Berekszó =

Berekszó is the Hungarian name for two villages in Romania:

- Bârsău village, Hărău Commune, Hunedoara County
- Beregsău Mare village, Săcălaz Commune, Timiș County
