= Certej (river) =

Certej Csertés-patak
- Location within Romania

Location
- Country: Romania
- Counties: Hunedoara County
- Villages: Hondol, Certeju de Sus, Bârsău, Hărău

Physical characteristics
- Mouth: Mureș
  - location: Bălata
  - coordinates: 45.9050°N 22.9173°E
- Length: 18 km (11 mi)
- Basin size: 78 km^{2} (30 sq mi)

Basin features
- Progression: Mureș→ Tisza→ Danube→ Black Sea
- Tributaries
  - left: Nojag

The Certej (Hungarian: Csertés-patak) is a right tributary of the river Mureș in Romania. It discharges into the Mureș near the city Deva. Its length is 18 km (11 mi) and its basin size is 78 km^{2} (30 sq mi).
