= 1965 La Ligua earthquake =

Earthquake and mining disaster in Chile

- Location within South America
- UTC time: 1965-03-28 16:33:16
- ISC event: 858940
- USGS-ANSS: ComCat
- Local date: March 28, 1965
- Local time: 12:33 pm CLST (UTC-03:00)
- Magnitude: 7.4–7.6 M_{w} 7.5 M_{s}
- Depth: 70.0 km (43.5 mi)
- Epicenter: 32.522°S 71.233°W
- Type: Normal (Intraplate)
- Areas affected: Chile
- Total damage: US$125 million (1965 rate)
- Max. intensity: MMI IX (Violent)
- Tsunami: None
- Landslides: Yes
- Foreshocks: M_{w} 6.2–6.4
- Aftershocks: Yes
- Casualties: 400–500 dead

The 1965 La Ligua earthquake (also known as the Aconcagua earthquake) struck near La Ligua in Aconcagua Province, Chile, about 140 km (87 mi) from the capital Santiago on Sunday, March 28 at 12:33 local time. The moment magnitude (M_{w}) 7.4–7.6 earthquake killed 400–500 people and inflicted US$1 billion (adjusted for inflation) in damage. Many deaths were from El Cobre, a mining location that was wiped out after a series of dam failures caused by the earthquake spilled mineral waste onto the area, burying hundreds of residents. The shock was felt throughout the country and along the Atlantic coast of Argentina.

== Tectonic setting ==
Earthquakes are frequent in Chile, which lies in the so-called Ring of Fire, where many of the world's active volcanoes and seismic activities are concentrated. Off the coast of Chile, the Nazca plate subducts beneath the South American plate along the Peru–Chile Megathrust; a convergent plate boundary. Active subduction produce large earthquakes including the 1960 Valdivia earthquake which had a magnitude of 9.5–9.6 on the moment magnitude scale. These earthquakes are associated with thrust faulting on the interface of the plate boundary megathrust. Thrusting during large earthquakes cause significant uplift of the seafloor, causing tsunamis. In some occasions, earthquakes occur within the downgoing tectonic plate instead.

== Earthquake ==
On 22 March 1965, a magnitude 6.2–6.4 earthquake rocked the coastal town of Los Vilos at a depth of 48.8 kilometers (30.3 miles), slightly north of the epicenter of the mainshock. It has been interpreted as a foreshock of the March 28 quake, although both events were on separate fault planes. The foreshock had a thrust mechanism, different from the mechanism of the mainshock. It occurred much shallower and based on the focal mechanism analyzed, was interpreted as an interplate earthquake on the plate boundary. Whether the 22 March quake was a true foreshock or the seven day time separation was sheer coincidence may never be determined.

The M_{s} 7.5 or M_{w} 7.4 mainshock nucleated about 72 kilometers (45 miles) beneath the community of La Ligua. The focal mechanism of this earthquake suggests normal faulting within the slab of the Nazca plate rather than on the subduction zone interface of the megathrust. The earthquake rupture within the slab occurred on a near-vertical normal fault.

Records of aftershocks are sparse due to the poor instrumentation at the time. Few moderately-sized events were recorded. Local seismic stations managed to record approximately five aftershocks each day. Intraslab earthquakes are common in the region as the subducting plate flexes and deform. The largest intermediate-depth intraslab earthquake in the region was a M_{w} 8.0 beneath Antofagasta.

== Impact ==
The maximum intensity of the earthquake was assigned IX (Violent) on the Modified Mercalli intensity scale. The earthquake inflicted serious damage to adobe and unreinforced masonry buildings. Over 21,000 houses collapsed and 70,000 had to be repaired. Houses made of hollow concrete units were especially severely affected, cracks appeared due to the lack of bonding between bricks and the concrete fillings, shear failure, and damage to beams.

At the time it had struck, many Chileans had just finished preparing their lunch means or returned from church services. This may have reduced the anticipated death toll because many churches had collapsed from ground motions, and there were very few instances of conflagrations. In Salamanca and Illapel, over 100,000 people were left homeless. The Department of Illapel reported more than 90% of homes had been damaged, and a hospital was completely destroyed, adding that "only facades of the houses remain standing".

Valparaíso reported 25 deaths and 40% of its buildings damaged from the earthquake. At Santiago, the shock knocked out electricity and stirred panic in many neighborhoods. Four persons died from the temblor, including a woman who fell to her death after jumping off the second floor of a hospital and another during a stampede to race for the exit at a racetrack after a grandstand collapsed, while ten were injured. An estimated 2,000 homes were badly damaged in the capital.

Additional casualties were reported at Llay-Llay, where four people had died, two each in La Laguna and Quilpué, and one each in San Felipe, Colina, Melon, Olmué and Ventanas. Three deaths were from Viña del Mar when a wall fell on those victims.

== Chile mining disaster ==
1965 Central Chile mining disaster
- Date: 28 March 1965
- Location: Chile; 32.639°S 71.162°W
- Type: Tailings dam failure
- Cause: Earthquake + Liquefaction
- Outcome: Tailings from the failures travelled downstream and buried the town of El Cobre.
- Deaths: 350–400

Severe liquefaction from the earthquake resulted in the failure of 17 tailing dams, the most severe of which affected the town of El Cobre, killing hundreds of residents and workers. Tailing dams failing because of seismic activities were a known risk to surrounding communities, as seen in previous events. Many of these incidents were a result of liquefaction with flow failure, slope instability and quake-related deformations or overtopping. Similar instances of sand tailing dams failing were also observed during earthquakes in 1981, 1985, 1997, and 2010.

=== El Cobre dam failure ===
Two dams belonging to the El Soldado mine released 350,000 and 1,900,000 cubic meters (12,000,000 and 67,000,000 cubic feet) cubic meters of debris respectively, and traveled 12 kilometers (7.5 miles) downstream which destroyed the town of El Cobre, in La Calera, burying it under three feet of muck. About 60 to 70 farmhouses and cottages were swept away by the cascading debris flow. Many of the casualties were miners and peasants who were mining for copper. The official death toll is at 247, but is thought to be as high as 350–400.

== Aftermath ==
In the immediate hours of the quake, cabinet ministers met with the President of Chile, Eduardo Frei Montalva. The Ministers of Public Works and Defence were taken to the affected town of Llay-Llay to survey the damage extent and plan the rescue and recovery efforts. The Chilean Army was called in for aid to mobilize the arrival of tents and makeshift kitchens to those who had lost their homes. Government officials and military chiefs were also involved in the distribution of food, water, and medical aid.

=== Legacy ===
This tragedy, along with the 1960 earthquakes, was one of the reasons for the formation of the National Office of Emergency of the Interior Ministry which oversees natural disasters and rescue efforts in Chile. Prior to the disaster, there had not been any formal organization to coordinate any rescue and recovery efforts, mainly because local officials and residents have endured many of the frequent earthquakes in the area.

The dam failures marked a series of changes to the civil engineering and mining community, and the design of tailing dams. Upstream tailing dams were opted for other means such as downstream tailings dams, rock-fills, and earth dams, despite the higher costs.

== See also ==
- List of earthquakes in Chile
- List of earthquakes in 1965
- List of tailings dam failures
