= 2025 Sino-Metals Leach Zambia dam disaster =

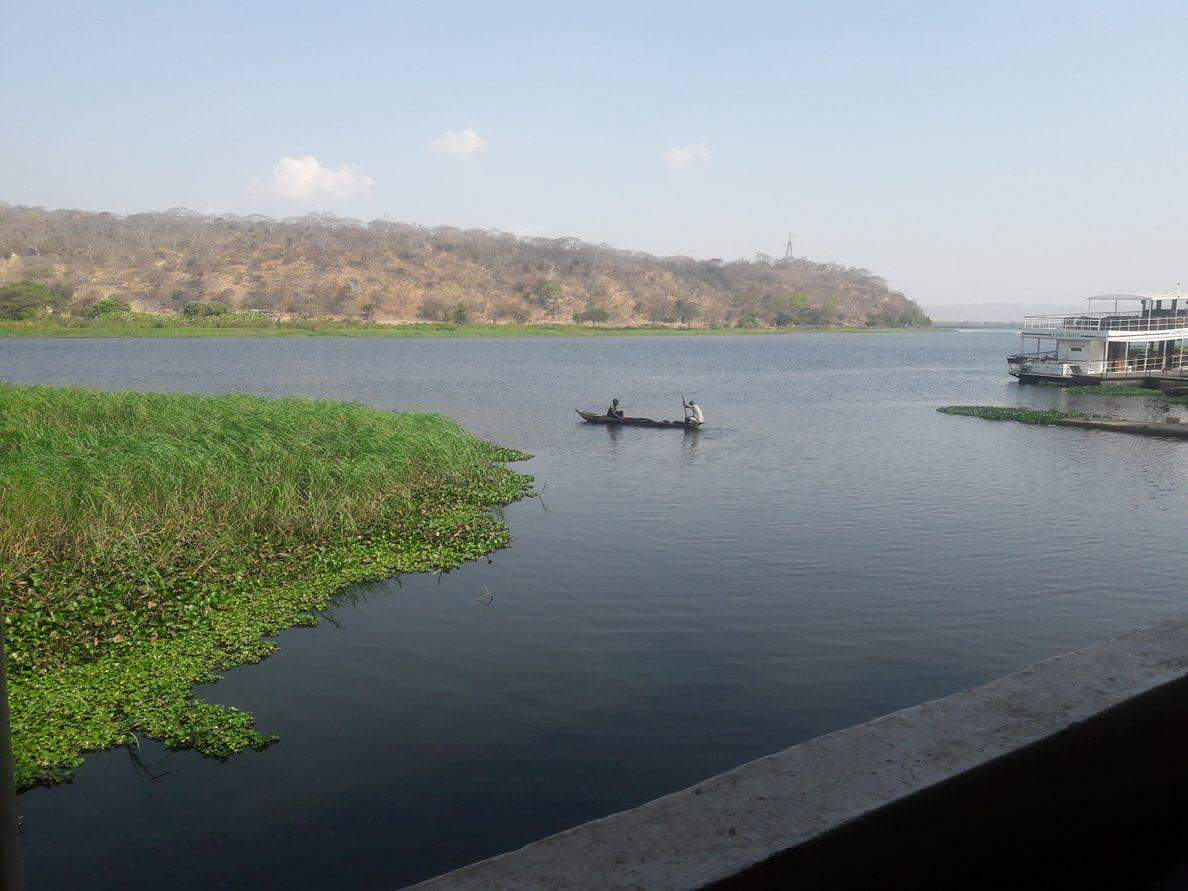
- Kafue River in Zambia
- Date: February–March 2025
- Location: Kafue River basin, Zambia; 12°38′58″S 28°02′12″E
- Type: Environmental disaster
- Cause: Catastrophic failure of a tailings dam for copper extraction

A major environmental disaster began on 18 February 2025, when a tailings dam collapsed at a copper mine owned by a Chinese state-owned enterprise in northern Zambia, releasing approximately 50 million litres (13 million US gallons) of acidic and highly toxic waste into the Kafue River ecosystem. The contamination severely impacted aquatic life, water supplies, and agricultural activities along the river, which serves as a critical water source for approximately 60% of Zambia's population.

== Background ==
The Kafue River is described by the Engineering Institution of Zambia as Zambia's most important waterway, flowing for over 1,500 kilometres (930 mi) through the country. It forms part of the crucial Kafue River basin where approximately 12 million of Zambia's 20 million citizens reside, or roughly 60% of the population. The river provides drinking water to approximately five million people, including residents of Lusaka, the nation's capital. The river also supports fishing activities and agricultural irrigation for farmers, while supplying water for industrial operations.

The Copperbelt Province in northern Zambia hosts numerous mining operations, with Chinese companies maintaining a dominant presence in the copper extraction industry. Zambia was ranked within the top ten copper producers worldwide. Critics have accused Chinese corporation-owned copper mines of disregarding safety, labour, and environmental regulations in their pursuit to control Zambia's copper supply. Zambia held significant economic ties to China, including debts of over US$4 billion to China that required restructuring after Zambia defaulted on repayments in 2020.

== Dam failure ==
On 18 February 2025, a containment structure at the Sino-Metals Leach Zambia mining facility failed catastrophically. Engineering Institution of Zambia investigators determined that a tailings dam, designed to store mining waste, collapsed. The structural failure released approximately 50 thousand cubic metres (13 million US gallons) of highly toxic effluent containing concentrated acid and dissolved solids.

The contaminated discharge flowed into the Kafue River via its tributary, the Mwambashi River. Within hours of the spill, environmental impacts became evident as aquatic life began dying throughout the affected waterway. Witnesses living along the river reported that the previously "vibrant and alive" river appeared to have "died overnight," with fish mortality and the disappearance of birdlife occurring almost immediately following the dam failure.

== Impact ==
=== Environmental ===
The spill created widespread ecological damage that was observed at least 100 kilometres (60 mi) downstream from the mining facility. A mass mortality of fish populations, with dead specimens washing onto riverbeds, and the disappearance of birdlife from "previously thriving" riverine habitats were reported. Agricultural crops along the river banks were destroyed as mining waste seeped into the soil, potentially contaminating groundwater reservoirs. The heavy and chronic exposure of the ecosystem to mining waste led to concerns about long-term ecosystem damage and bioaccumulation of heavy metals. Environmental activist Chilekwa Mumba characterized the event as "an environmental disaster really of catastrophic consequences."

=== Public ===
The contamination caused immediate harm to communities dependent on the Kafue River. Authorities were forced to completely shut down the water supply to Kitwe, a city of approximately 700,000 residents located near the mine.

Ground nut and maize fields belonging to local settlements along the river were destroyed. The agricultural plots of farmers along the river were contaminated, reportedly with several yields being completely destroyed about two months prior to harvest time.

On 6 August 2025, the US Embassy ordered all American government personnel to leave areas affected by the disaster in February, citing continuing contamination and the possible presence of airborne hazards.

== Response ==
=== Zambian response ===
Zambian President Hakainde Hichilema characterized the situation as a crisis and requested expert assistance in mitigating the contamination and its effects on the public. The Zambian Air Force was deployed to release several hundreds of tons of lime in the river to neutralize the acidic contamination, aided by speedboats which applied lime along the river course. Zambian government spokesperson Cornelius Mweetwa announced that Sino-Metals Leach Zambia would pay for all cleanup operations, with authorities ordering the suspension of operations at the responsible mine.

Zambia's Ministry of Water Development and Sanitation issued statements acknowledging the "devastating consequences" of the spill, with particular concern about groundwater contamination as toxic materials seep into soil or migrate to new areas. Environmental engineer Mweene Himwinga, who participated in meetings addressing the disaster, expressed frustration about the negligence many foreign investors had towards environmental conservation. Zambia's Ministry of Fisheries and Livestock released a public advisory on 23 February, instructing residents to avoid consuming any aquatic life in the Kafue River or other waterways in the basin.

In September 2025, a group composed of 176 farmers filed a lawsuit against multiple Chinese-linked mining firms for $80 billion over agricultural damages caused by the spill.

=== Chinese response ===
Zhang Peiwen, chairman of Sino-Metals Leach Zambia, held a meeting with Zambian government ministers following the incident. According to a transcript released by the company, Zhang offered an apology for the waste spill and acknowledged the disaster as having "rung a big alarm for Sino-Metals Leach and the mining industry". He promised that the company would "go all out" to protect and restore the river environment as quickly as they could. The company required a non-disclosure agreement for compensation claims.

== See also ==
- Kabwe mine
- 2006 Ivory Coast toxic waste dump
