= Oberrothenbach =

- Ortsteil of Zwickau
- Interactive map of Oberrothenbach
- Location within Germany Location within Saxony
- Coordinates: 50°46′00″N 12°28′20″E
- Country: Germany
- State: Saxony
- District: Zwickau
- Town: Zwickau

Population (2018-12-31)
  - Total: 647
- Time zone: UTC+01:00 (CET)
  - Summer (DST): UTC+02:00 (CEST)

Oberrothenbach (German pronunciation: [ˈo:bɐ̯ʁɔtn̩ˌbax]) is a village (Ortsteil) and former municipality in Saxony, Germany. It was incorporated into the municipality of Zwickau in 1999. Its population was 647 in 2018. Oberrothenbach is situated on the left bank of the Zwickauer Mulde, 6 km north of the centre of Zwickau.

== History ==
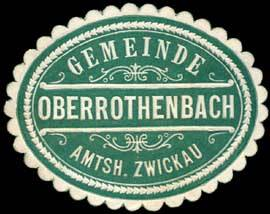
Siegelmark of Oberrothenbach dating c. 1850 - 1923, when the village was a Gemeinde

Oberrothenbach is first definitively attested in 1221 as Rudnbax. An early local legend apparently involves the Virgin Mary appearing to a founder and saying, "Here you will build a haven for laborers." The settlement later flourished as a mining area by the Late Middle Ages, of which it was part of Electoral Saxony. During the Industrial Revolution in the German Empire, industrial mineral mining would be established in the town and many moved to Oberrothenbach to work.

After the end of World War II, the Soviet Union secretly set up an industrial operation in Occupied Germany and later East Germany, particularly in the villages of the region such as Wismut and Oberrothenbach. Before the end of the Cold War and fall of the communist regime, over 20,000 workers died from harsh labor, radiation and other pollution. Conditions were so bad, the local saying of the region was "Kumpels sterben früher", German for: "Buddies (miners/coworkers in this context) die young".

Although the operation is now abandoned, the effects last to this day. About 450,000 people worked in the factories and mines in the village's history. Exposed to radon, arsenic, radioactive dust, lead, and other toxic compounds, an estimated 10–15,000 deaths are expected from illnesses such as cancer. A barbed-wire fence was built around the local polluted lake in the 1980s, which no longer supports most life.

== Today ==
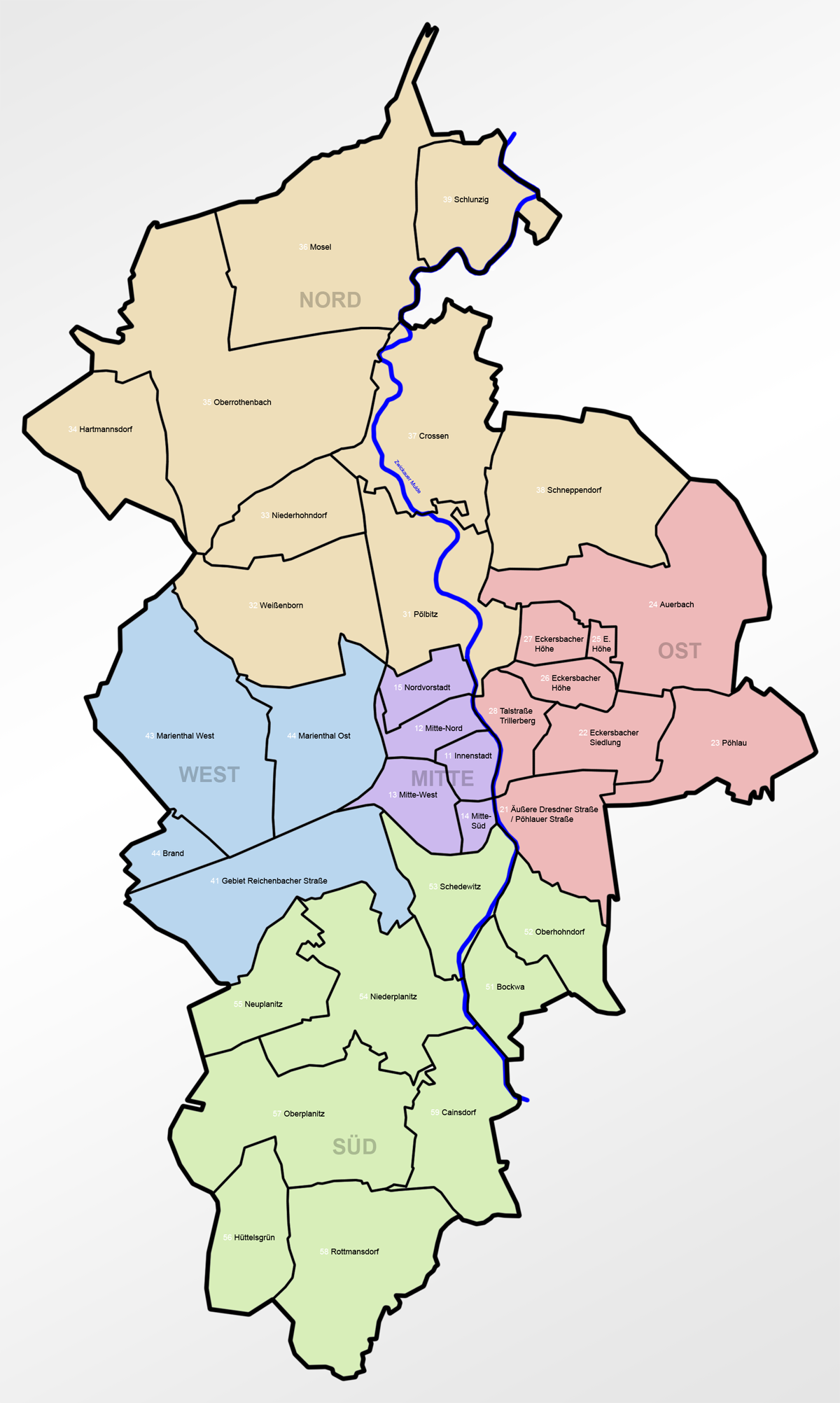
The village now forms part 35 of the Northern district of Zwickau (Nord-Zwickau).

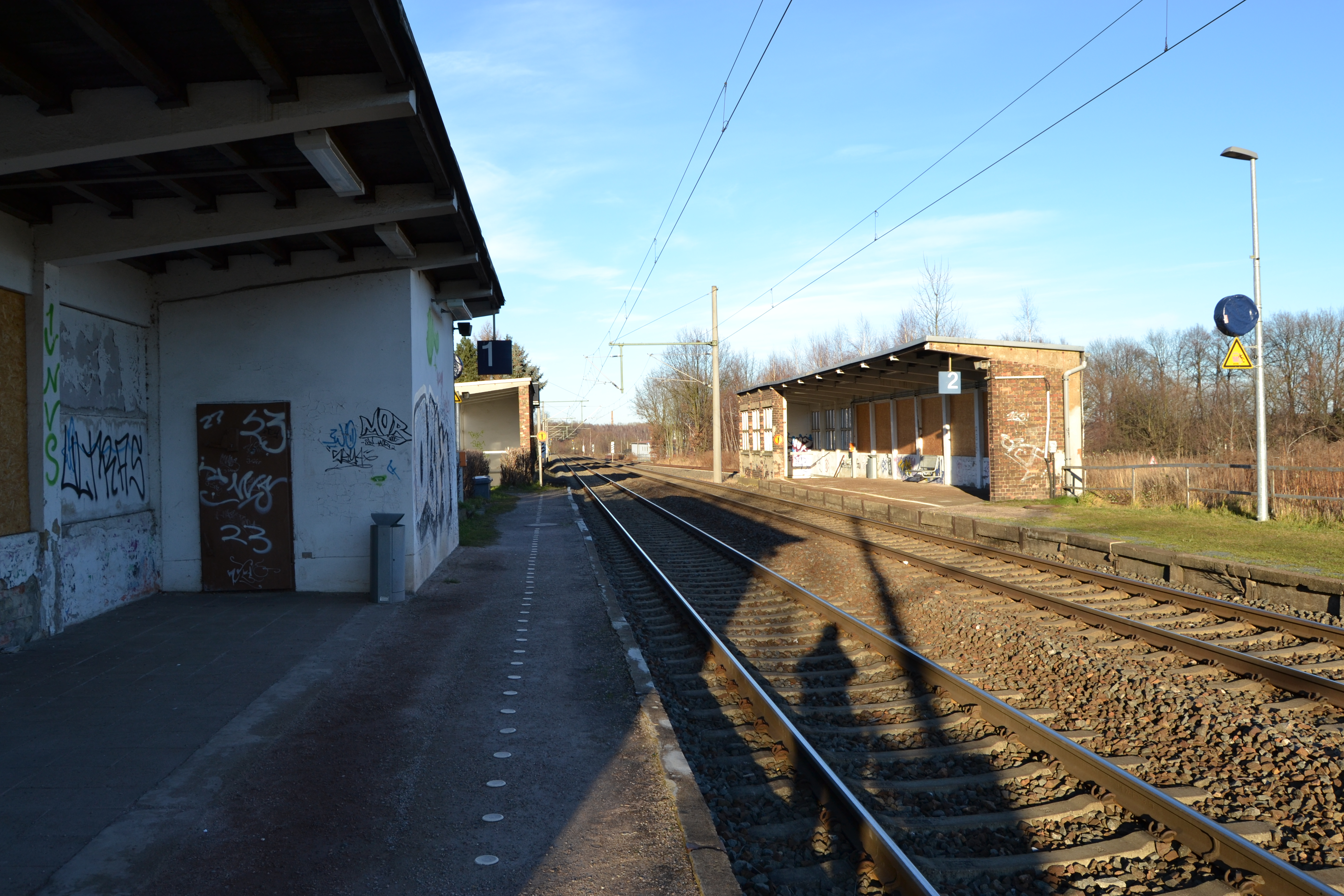
Haltepunkt at train station in Oberrothenbach

Oberrothenbach is a quiet village within Zwickau, hosting approximately 700 inhabitants, mainly working-class. The population was less than 400 in 1993. The village hosts several events and attractions for tourists such as festivals common in German culture.

== Population ==
Historical population
Year	Pop.	±% p.a.
1999	689	—
2000	664	−3.63%
2001	661	−0.45%
2002	676	+2.27%
2003	660	−2.37%
2004	643	−2.58%
2005	618	−3.89%
2008	625	+0.38%
2010	646	+1.67%
2014	641	−0.19%
2018	647	+0.23%
Source: Stadt Zwickau
