= 1971 Certej dam failure =

Flood due to failure of tailings dam which led to deaths

Coordinates: 45.9607°N 22.9798°E

The 1971 Certej dam failure was a flood due to the failure of a tailings dam at the Certej mine which led to the death of 89 people. It occurred on 30 October 1971 in Certeju de Sus commune, Hunedoara County, Romania.

== Background ==
The tailing pond of Certej was used between 1936 and 1971 to hold the cyanide-laced acid tailings resulting from the gold mine exploitation of Certej.

== The disaster ==
At 4:55 a.m., the dam broke for a length of 80 metres (87 yd) and from the tailings pond, 300,000 cubic metres (390,000 cu yd) of residue flowed towards the town of Certej, flooding a radius of around 4–5 kilometres (2.5–3.1 mi) around the pond. The flood completely destroyed six apartment buildings, a dormitory building and seven individual houses, resulting in 89 deaths and 76 people being wounded. Due to the early hour of the dam failure, most of the victims were asleep, which resulted in the high death toll.

== Aftermath ==
The Romanian Communist authorities announced in the press only 48 deaths, in order to avoid declaration of a national day of mourning. The survivors were compensated for the loss of their dwellings, receiving from the state an apartment or construction materials to rebuild their houses.

A governmental commission made out of 16 experts was created to investigate the disaster. Following their investigation, they found that the tailings lost their stability due to the increase in height over the allowed limits. Also, a factor may have been the heterogenous content of the pond, as between 1936 and 1971, various materials were deposited, having different characteristics, leading to a fault slip.

The prosecutors investigated the dam planner and five other people, but eventually they decided to drop all charges, as the disaster could not have been easily predicted.

== See also ==
- Ok Tedi environmental disaster – a similar tailings dam rupture in Papua New Guinea in 1984, still causing environmental damage for decades thereafter
- Merriespruit tailings dam disaster in South Africa in 1994
- 2000 Baia Mare cyanide spill, also in Romania
- Ajka alumina plant accident in Hungary in 2010
- Bento Rodrigues dam disaster in Brazil in 2015
