= Environmental emergency =

Type of emergency that causes severe environmental damage

An environmental emergency is defined as a "sudden-onset disaster or accident resulting from natural, technological or human-induced factors, or a combination of these, that causes or threatens to cause severe environmental damage as well as loss of human lives and property." (UNEP/GC.22/INF/5, 13 November 2002.)

Following a disaster or conflict, an environmental emergency can occur when people's health and livelihoods are at risk due to the release of hazardous and noxious substances, or because of significant damage to the ecosystem. Examples include fires, oil spills, chemical accidents, toxic waste dumping and groundwater pollution.

The environmental risks can be acute and life-threatening. According to the International Disaster Database (EM-DAT), between 2003 and 2013, there were 380 industrial accidents reported, affecting 207 668 people and resulting in over US$22 million in losses. Climate change is having an unprecedented effect on the occurrence of natural disasters and the associated risk of environmental emergencies. With climate change already stretching the disaster relief system, future climate-related emergency events will generate increased and more costly demands for assistance.

== Context ==
All disasters have some environmental impacts.

Some of these may be immediate and life-threatening – for example, when an earthquake damages an industrial facility, which in turn releases hazardous materials. In such cases these so-called 'secondary impacts' may cause as much damage as the initial causal factor.

For example, Typhoon Haiyan/Yolanda that struck the Philippines in November 2013, caused massive destruction and had a huge human toll but also generated a spill of around 800,000 litres of heavy oil, when a power barge ran aground in Estancia, Iloilo province, at the height of the typhoon.

Disasters may also have longer-term impacts. For example, natural disasters may cause long-term waste management difficulties or ecosystem damage.

== Major international conferences ==
The Environmental Emergencies Forum is a unique biennial international forum that brings together disaster managers and environmental experts from governments, UN agencies, industries, academies, NGOs and civil society to improve prevention, preparedness, response and overall resilience to environmental emergencies. It also provides guidance for the Joint UNEP/OCHA Environment Unit, which provides a Secretariat to the meeting. The most recent meeting was held in Norway in June 2015. The next meeting will be held in Nairobi in June 2017.

== Relevant organizations ==
=== United Nations ===
The Joint United Nations Environment Programme (UNEP)/Office for the Coordination of Humanitarian Affairs (OCHA) Environment Unit (JEU): By pairing the UNEP's technical expertise with OCHA's humanitarian response network, the Joint UNEP/OCHA Environment Unit (JEU) mobilizes and coordinates a comprehensive response to environmental emergencies to protect lives, livelihoods, ecosystems and future generations. The JEU can be reached 24 hours/day, seven days/week, all year round and operates at the request of affected countries. The JEU can be called by member states when acute environmental risks to life and health as a result of conflicts, natural disasters and industrial accidents are suspected.

The JEU hosts the Environmental Emergencies Centre (www.eecentre.org), an online tool designed primarily to provide national responders with a one-stop-shop of all information relevant to the preparedness, prevention and response stages of an environmental emergency. Website: www.unocha/org/unep; www.eecentre.org

== See also ==
- Disaster management
- Environmental crime
- Environmental disaster
- Natural disasters
- Risk management
- UNISDR
- Vulnerability
- World Conference on Disaster Reduction
