= Environmental disaster =

Disaster to the natural environment due to human activity

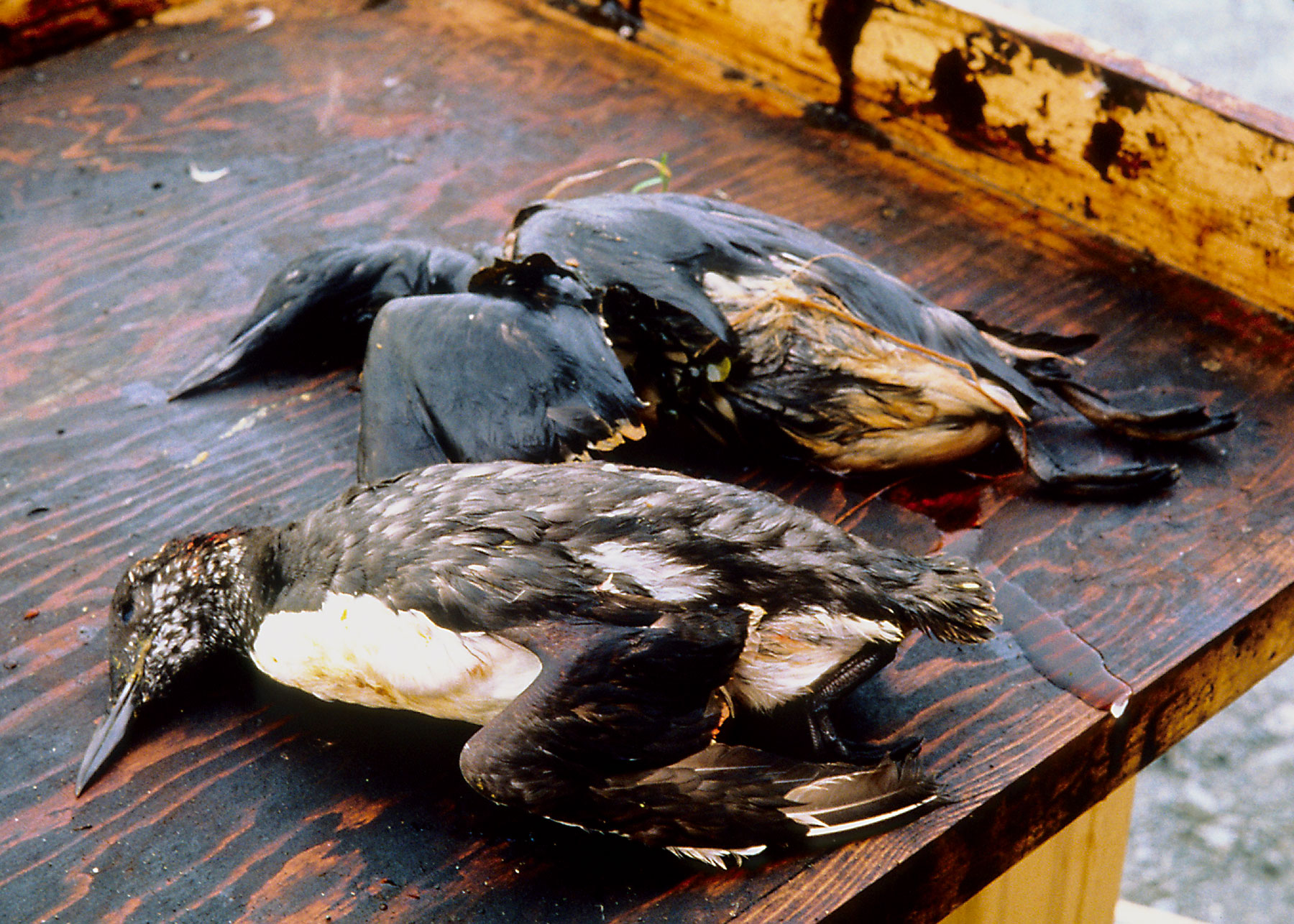
Seabirds killed by the Exxon Valdez oil spill in Alaska's Prince William Sound. The spill in March 1989 dumped approximately 10.8 million US gallons of crude oil into the environment, killing over 250,000 seabirds, 2,800 sea otters, 300 harbor seals, 250 bald eagles, and numerous other wildlife. The Alaskan fishing industry also suffered tremendously as a result of the spill.

An environmental disaster or ecological disaster is defined as a catastrophic event regarding the natural environment that is due to human activity. This point distinguishes environmental disasters from other disturbances such as natural disasters and intentional acts of war such as nuclear bombings.

Environmental disasters show how the impact of humans' alteration of the land has led to widespread and/or long-lasting consequences. These disasters have included deaths of wildlife, humans and plants, or severe disruption of human life or health, possibly requiring migration. Some environmental disasters are the trigger source of more expansive environmental conflicts, where effected groups try to socially confront the actors responsible for the disaster.

== Environmental disasters ==
Environmental disasters have historically affected agriculture, wildlife biodiversity, the economy, and human health. The most common causes include pollution that seeps into groundwater or a body of water, emissions into the atmosphere, and depletion of natural resources, industrial activity, and agricultural practices.

The following is a list of major environmental disasters:

- Seveso disaster, 1976 – Release of dioxin in Italy by a small chemical manufacturing plant. The resulting contamination led to thousands of human hospitalizations, and the deaths of more than 25% of local fauna. To prevent the chemical from entering the food chain, the town culled over 80,000 animals.
- Love Canal disaster, 1978 – Neighborhood in Niagara Falls, New York that was contaminated by 21,000 tons of toxic chemicals, including at least twelve that are known carcinogens (halogenated organics, chlorobenzenes, and dioxins among them), from a former chemical waste dump site. President Carter declared a state of emergency in 1978, and it eventually led to the destruction of homes and relocation of more than 800 families. The effects of the disaster led to the 1980 Comprehensive Environmental Response, Compensation, and Liability Act, better known as Superfund. The Love Canal Disaster is also credited as the start of the environmental activism movement in the United States.
- Amoco Cadiz oil spill, 1978 – The vessel broke in two, releasing its entire cargo of 1.6 million barrels (250,000 m^{3}) of oil off the coast of Brittany, France. The amount of oil released totaled five times more than the Exxon Valdez spill in 1989.
- Ok Tedi environmental disaster, 1984 – As of 2006, mine operators have discharged about two billion tons of tailings, overburden and mine-induced erosion into the Ok Tedi river system. About 1,588 square kilometres (613 sq mi) of forest has died or is under stress.
- Bhopal disaster, 1984 – Release of methyl isocyanate gas and other chemicals. Some estimate 8,000 people died within two weeks. A government affidavit in 2006 stated the leak caused 558,125 injuries including 38,478 temporary partial and approximately 3,900 severely and permanently disabling injuries.
- Chernobyl disaster, 1986 – The official Soviet count of 31 deaths has been disputed. An UNSCEAR report places the total confirmed deaths from radiation at 64 as of 2008. The eventual death toll could reach 4,000. Some 50 emergency workers died of acute radiation syndrome, nine children died of thyroid cancer and an estimated total of 3940 died from radiation-induced cancer and leukemia.
- Hanford Nuclear, 1986 – The U.S. government declassified 19,000 pages of documents indicating that between 1946 and 1986, the Hanford Site near Richland, Washington, released thousands of US gallons of radioactive liquids. Radioactive waste was both released into the air and flowed into the Columbia River (which flows to the ocean).
- Exxon Valdez oil spill, 1989 – An Exxon supertanker spilled 260–750 thousand barrels (41,000–119,000 m^{3}) of crude oil.
- Kuwait oil fires, 1991 – Iraqi forces set 600-700 oil wells ablaze in retaliation to Desert Storm, which lasted seven months.
- Hickory Woods, 1998 – Neighborhood in Buffalo, New York that was developed on land contaminated by leftover coke from steel production factories. The contamination was known to be an issue and repeatedly investigated, but continuously deemed safe for residents. Toxic materials found included elevated levels of arsenic, chromium, lead, mercury, polycyclic aromatic hydrocarbons, naphthalene, dibenzofuran, and carbazole.
- Prestige oil spill, 2002 – Over 20 million US gallons (76,000 m^{3}) of two different grades of heavy fuel oil were spilled off the coast of Galicia, Spain.
- Prudhoe Bay oil spill, 2006 – Up to 267,000 US gallons (1,010 m^{3}; 6,400 bbl) of oil were spilled from a BP pipeline in Alaska.
- Kingston Fossil Plant coal fly ash slurry spill, 2008 – 1.1 billion US gallons (4,200,000 m^{3}) of slurry spilled from a coal plant, covering 300 acres, flowing down several rivers, destroying homes and contaminating water. The volume spilled was over 7 times as much as the volume of oil spilled in the Deepwater Horizon disaster.
- Deepwater Horizon oil spill, 2010 – An explosion killed 11 men working on the platform and injured 34 others. The gushing wellhead was capped, after it had released about 4.9 million barrels (780,000 m^{3}) of crude oil.
- Fukushima Daiichi nuclear disaster, 2011 – An energy accident initiated primarily by the tsunami following the Tōhoku earthquake on March 11, 2011. Immediately after the earthquake, the active reactors automatically shut down their sustained fission reactions. The insufficient cooling led to three nuclear meltdowns, hydrogen-air explosions, and the release of radioactive material. It was deemed a level 7 event classification of the International Nuclear Event Scale.
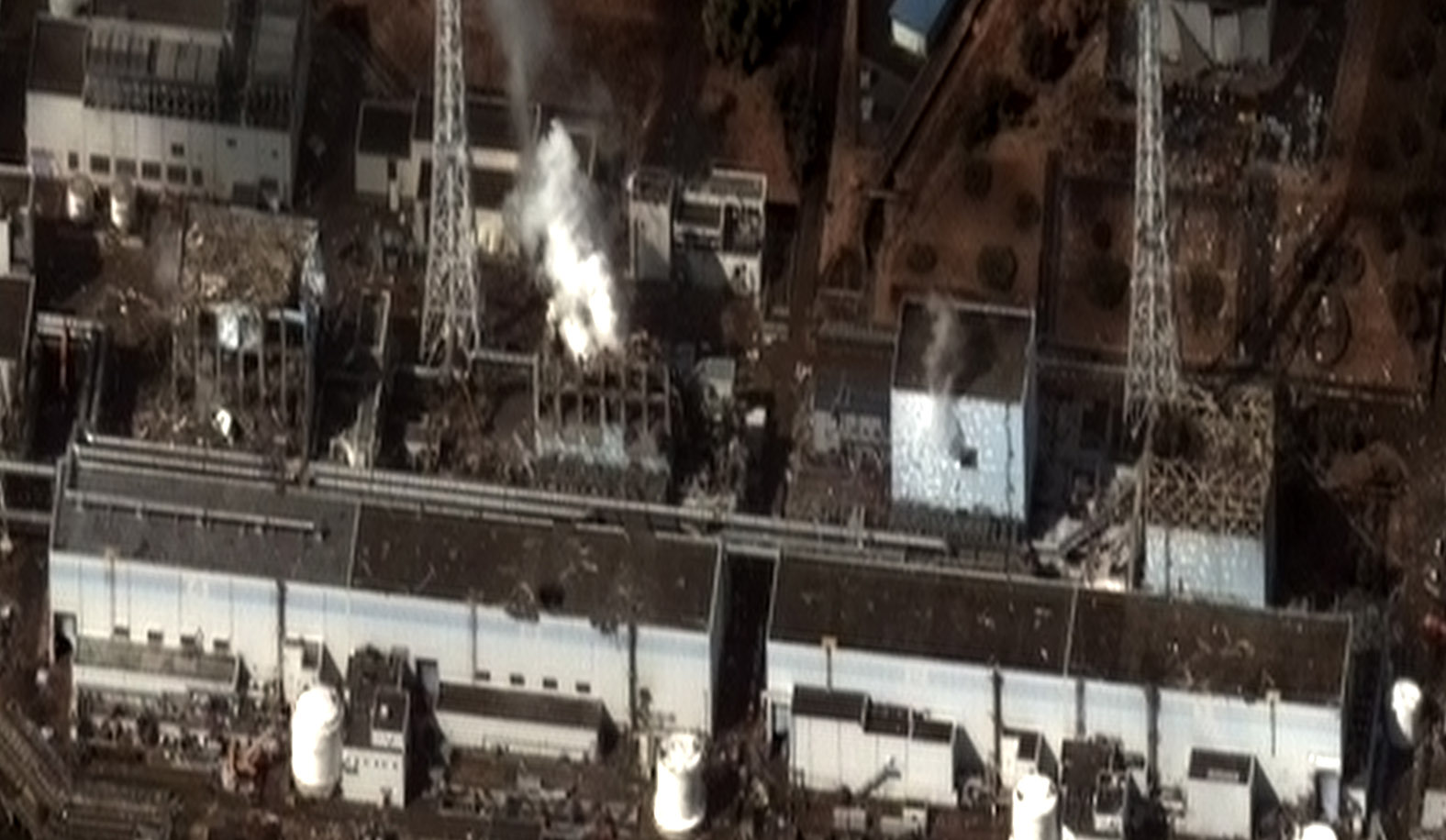
  As of 2013, the Fukushima nuclear disaster site remains highly radioactive, with some 160,000 evacuees still living in temporary housing, and some land will be unfarmable for centuries. The difficult cleanup job will take 40 or more years, and cost tens of billions of dollars.
- Oder environmental disaster, 2022 – A contamination of river Oder from unknown origin that has led to a mass mortality event of the local sea life.
- Ohio train derailment, 2023 – A Norfolk Southern freight train carrying hazardous materials derailed in East Palestine, Ohio. The rail cars burned for several days, releasing chemicals into the air. Norfolk has been accused of mismanagement.
- Red Sea crisis, 2024 – An 18 miles (29 km) long oil-spill during the United States–Houthi conflict in the Red Sea.
- Sino-Metals Leach Zambia dam disaster, 2025 – Catastrophic failure of a tailings dam constructed for copper extraction by Sino-Metals Leach Zambia, dumping approximately 50 million liters of acidic and highly toxic waste into the Kafue River basin. The pollution killed riverine ecosystems at least 62 miles (100 km) downstream and impacted the water and irrigation supply of 60% of Zambia's population.

=== Climate change and disaster risks ===
A 2013 report examined the relationship between disasters and poverty world-wide. It concludes that, without concerted action, there could be upwards of 325 million people living in the 49 countries most exposed to the full range of natural hazards and climate extremes in 2040.

==== Social vulnerability and environmental disaster ====
According to author Daniel Murphy, different groups can adapt to environmental disasters differently due to social factors such as age, race, class, gender, and nationality. Murphy argues that while developed countries with access to resources that can help mitigate environmental disasters often contribute the most to factors that can increase the risk of said disasters, developing countries experience the impacts of environmental disasters more intensely than their wealthier counterparts. It is often the case that the populations that do not contribute to climate change are not only in geographic locations that experience more environmental disasters, but also have fewer resources to mitigate the impact of the disasters. For example, when Hurricane Katrina hit Louisiana in 2005, many scientists argued that climate change had increased the severity of the hurricane. Although the majority of the U.S. emissions that can contribute to climate change come from industry and transport, the people who were hit hardest by Katrina were not the heads of large companies within the country. Rather, the poor Black communities within Louisiana were the most devastated by the hurricane.

== Mitigation efforts ==
There have been many attempts throughout recent years to mitigate the impact of environmental disasters. Environmental disaster is caused by human activity, so many believe that such disasters can be prevented or have their consequences reduced by human activity as well. Efforts to attempt mitigation are evident in cities such as Miami, Florida, in which houses along the coast are built a few feet off of the ground in order to decrease the damage caused by rising tides due to rising sea-levels. Although mitigation efforts such as those found in Miami might be effective in the short-term, many environmental groups are concerned with whether or not mitigation provides long-term solutions to the consequences of environmental disaster.

== See also ==
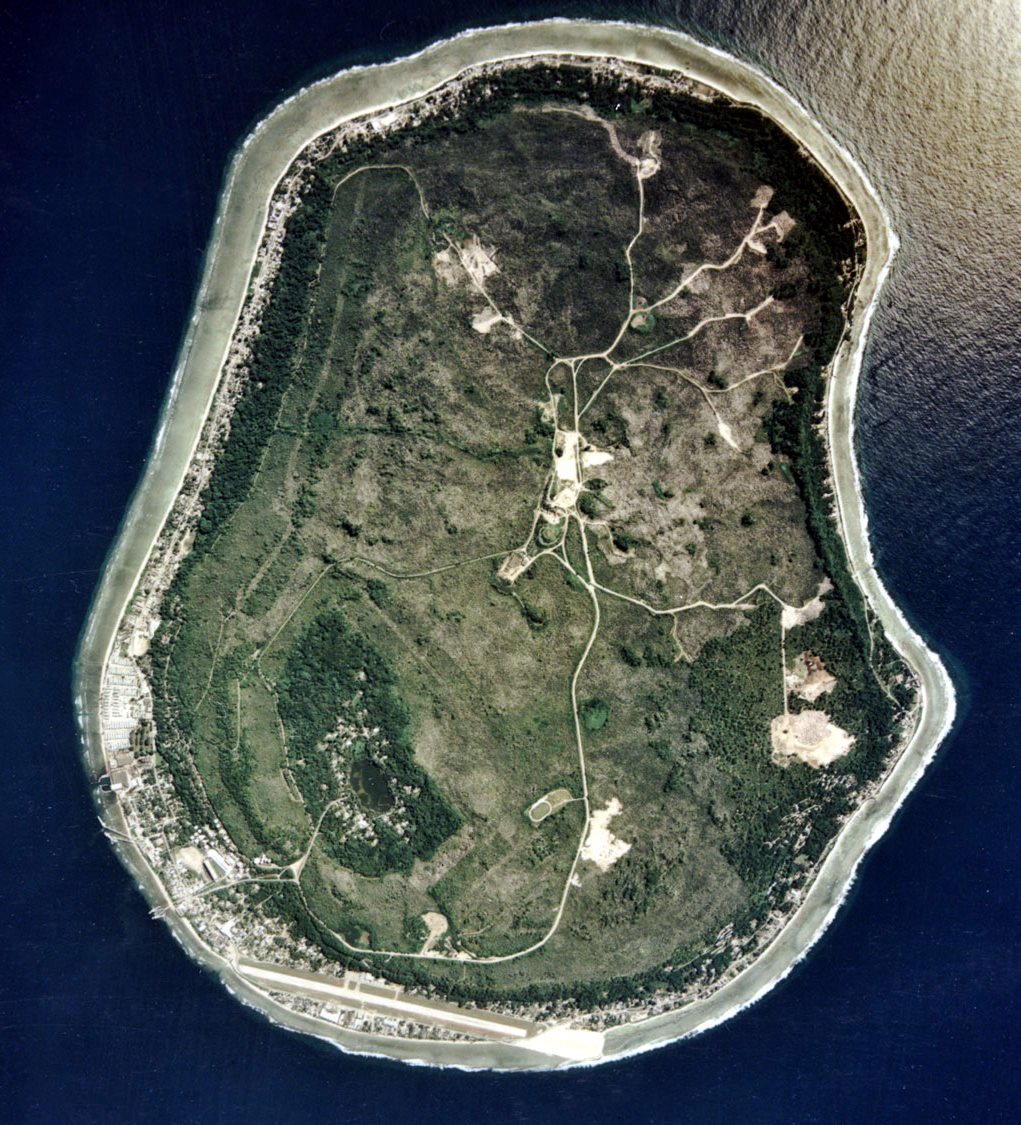
An aerial image of Nauru in 2002 from the U.S. Department of Energy's Atmospheric Radiation Measurement Program. Regenerated vegetation covers 63% of land that was mined

- Anthropogenic hazard
- List of environmental issues
- Environmental hazard
- Emergency management
- Environmental emergency
- Ecocide
- Malthusian catastrophe
