= Hărău =

- Commune
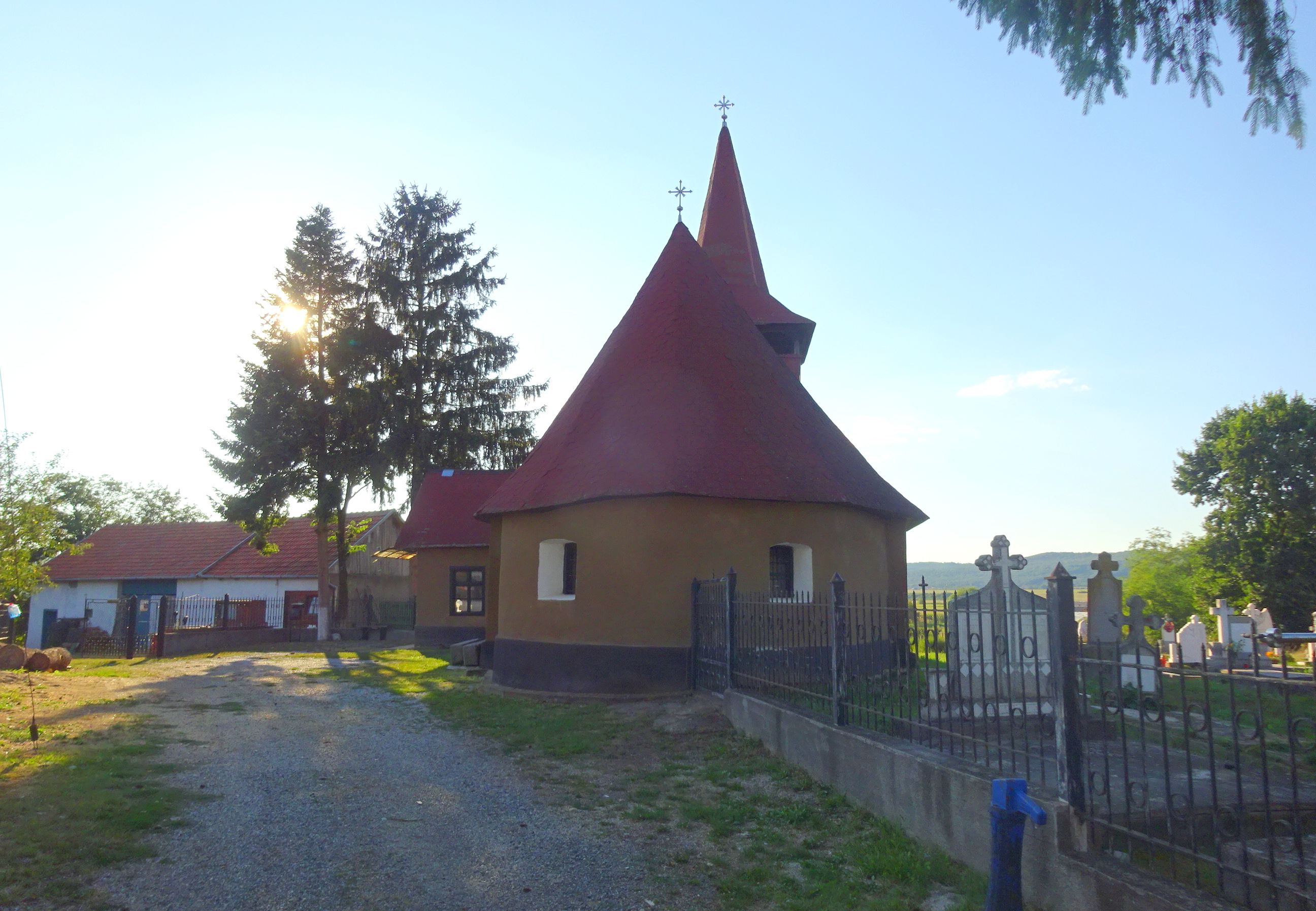
- Saint Demetrius of Thessaloniki Church in Hărău

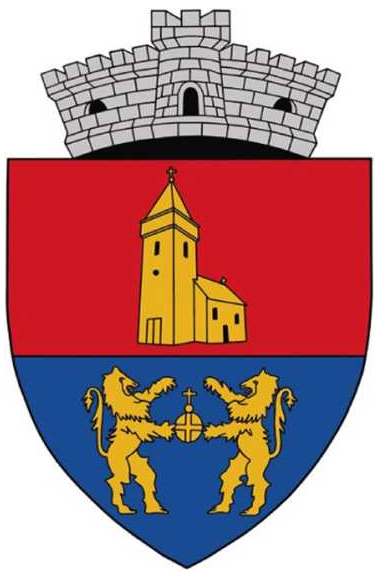
- Coat of arms

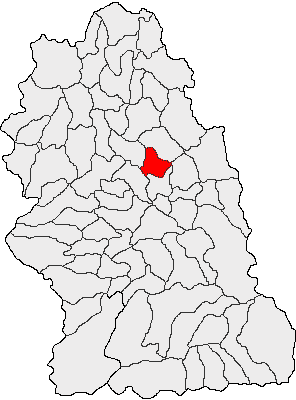
- Location in Hunedoara County

- Location in Romania
- Coordinates: 45°54′N 22°57′E
- Country: Romania
- County: Hunedoara

Government
  - Mayor (2024–2028): Lucian-Mihael Albu-Weber (PSD)
- Area: 49.86 km^{2} (19.25 sq mi)
- Elevation: 203 m (666 ft)
- Population (2021-12-01): 2,026
  - Density: 40.63/km^{2} (105.2/sq mi)
- Time zone: UTC+02:00 (EET)
  - Summer (DST): UTC+03:00 (EEST)
- Postal code: 337265
- Area code: (+40) 0254
- Vehicle reg.: HD
- Website: primariaharau.ro

Hărău (Hungarian: Haró, German: Haren) is a commune in Hunedoara County, Transylvania, Romania. It is composed of four villages: Banpotoc (Bánpatak), Bârsău (Berekszó), Chimindia (Kéménd), and Hărău.

Historical population
Year	Pop.	±%
1850	2,263	—
1910	2,951	+30.4%
2002	2,123	−28.1%
2011	2,231	+5.1%
2021	2,026	−9.2%
Source: Census data
