= 2000 Baia Mare cyanide spill =

Leak of cyanide near Baia Mare, Romania, into the Someș River

Coordinates: 47°39′00″N 23°38′30″E

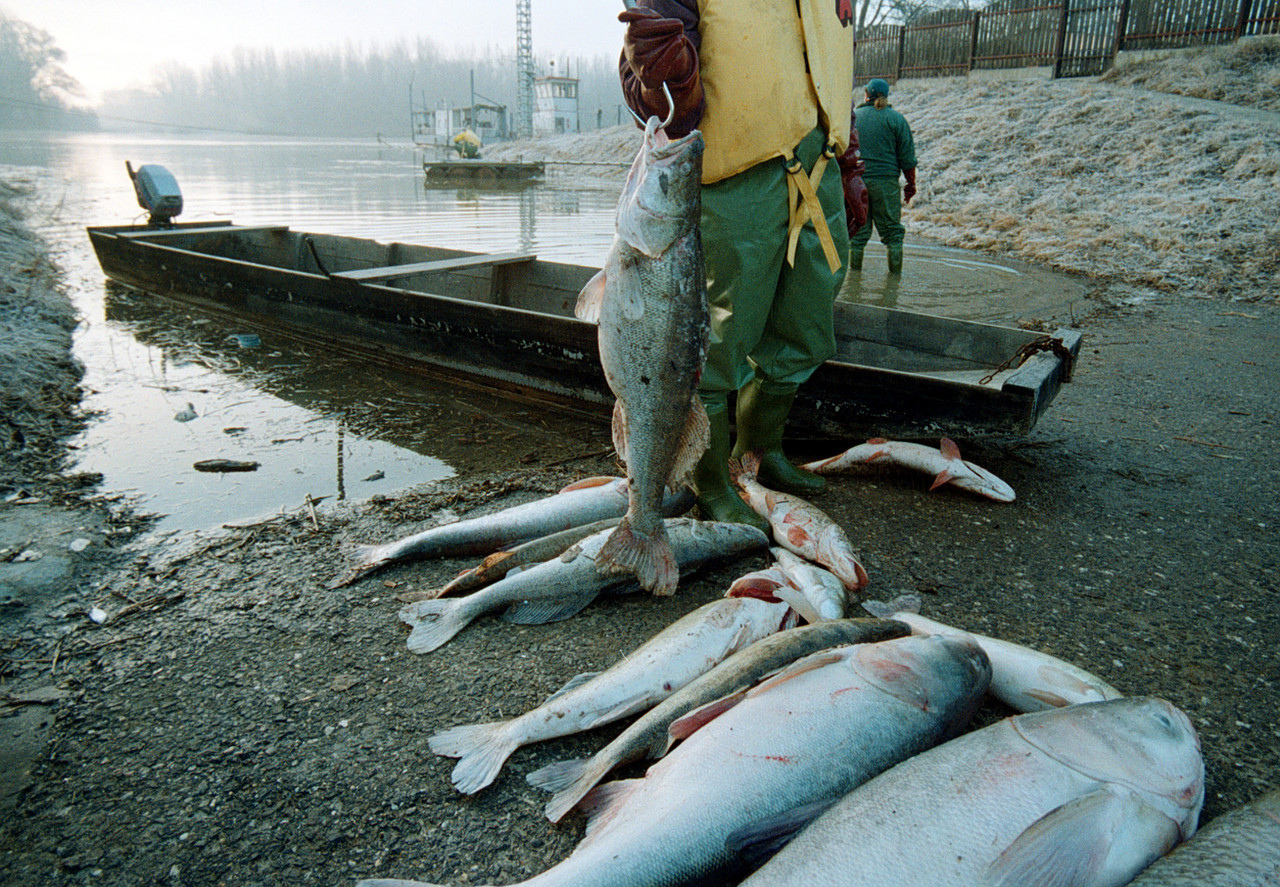
Dead fish in the Tisza River

The 2000 Baia Mare cyanide spill was a leak of cyanide near Baia Mare, Romania, into the Someș River by the gold mining company Aurul, a joint-venture of the Australian company Esmeralda Exploration and the Romanian government.

The polluted waters eventually reached the Tisza River and then the Danube, killing large numbers of fish in Hungary, Serbia, and Romania. The spill has been called the worst environmental disaster in Europe since the Chernobyl disaster.

== Background ==
Aurul, the mine operator, is a joint venture company formed by the Australian company Esmeralda Exploration and the Romanian government. The company claimed it had the ability to clean up the toxic tailings at the Baia Mare mine, which had begun to be spread as toxic dust by the wind. Promising to deal with them and to extract the remaining gold from them via gold cyanidation, the company shipped its waste product to a dam near Bozânta Mare, Maramureș County.

== Dam failure ==
On the night of January 30, 2000, a dam holding contaminated waters burst and 100,000 cubic metres (3,500,000 cu ft) of cyanide-contaminated water (containing an estimated 100 metric tons of cyanide) spilled over some farmland and then into the Someș river.

Esmeralda Exploration blamed excessive snowfall for the dam failure.

== Effects ==
After the spill, the Someș had cyanide concentrations of over 700 times the permitted levels. The Someș flows into the Tisza, Hungary's second largest river, which then flows into the Danube. The spill contaminated the drinking supplies of over 2.5 million Hungarians. In addition to cyanide, heavy metals were also washed into the river and had a long-lasting negative impact on the environment.

Wildlife was particularly affected on the Tisza: on a stretch, virtually all living things were killed, and further south, in the Serbian section, 80% of the aquatic life was killed; 200 tons of it was the fish in these rivers.

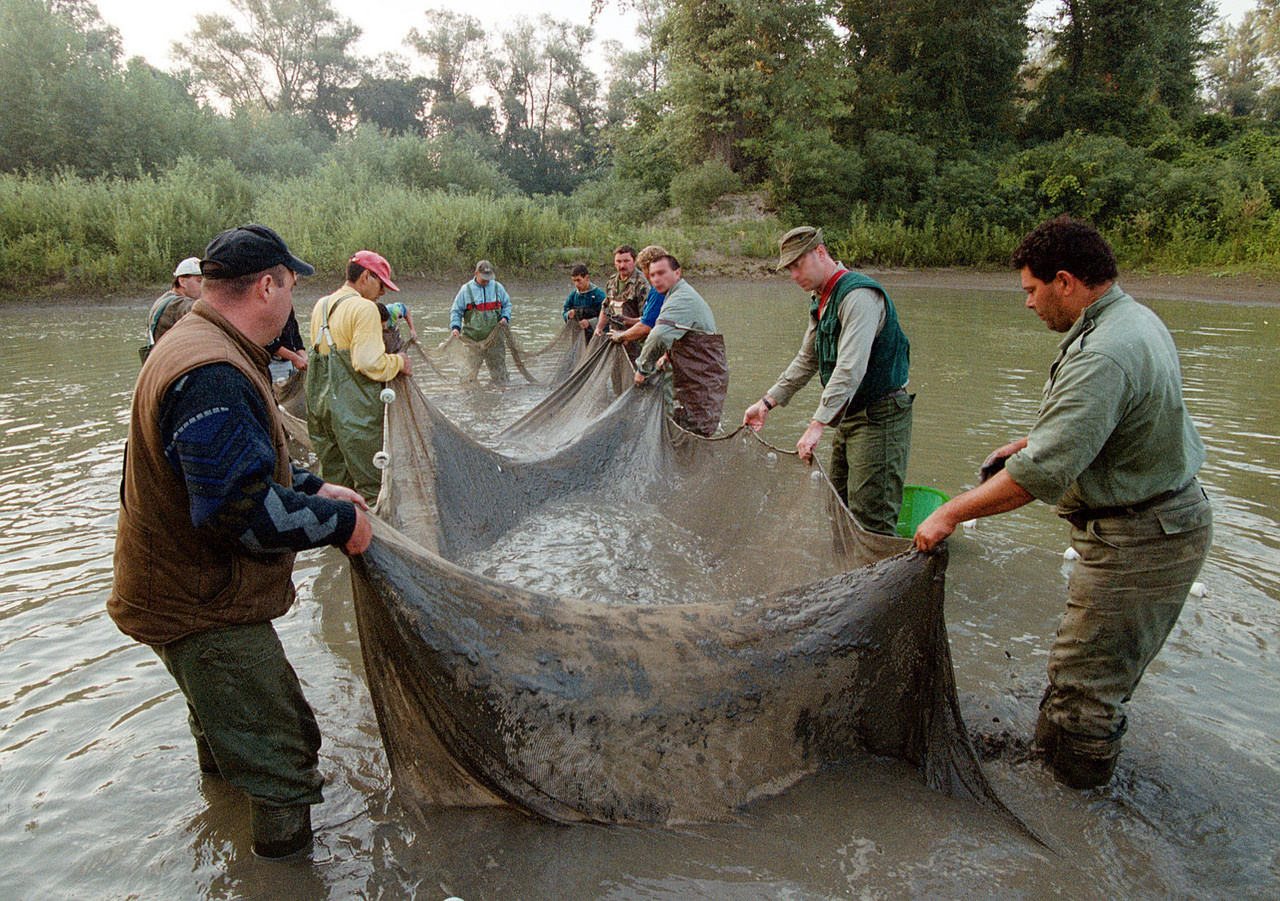
Volunteers work in the Tisza

Large numbers of fish died from the cyanide spill, affecting 62 species of fish, of which 20 were protected species. The Romanian government claimed that the fish had died of "cold", and that they were not at fault. In Hungary, volunteers participated in removing the dead fish to prevent the disaster from spreading across the food chain, as other animals, such as foxes, otters and ospreys had died after eating contaminated fish.

After the cyanide entered the Danube, the large volume of the river's water diluted the cyanide, but in some sections it still remained as high as 20 to 50 times the maximum permitted concentration.

Two years after the spill, the ecosystem began to recover, but it was still far from its pre-contamination state; Hungarian fishermen claimed that their catches in 2002 were at a fifth of the levels in 1999.

== Subsequent spills ==
Five weeks later, a spill of contaminated waters (this time with heavy metals) hit the region. A dyke burst in Băile Borșa, Maramureș County and 20,000 cubic metres of zinc, lead and copper-contaminated water made its way into the Tisza.

== Reactions ==
Brett Montgomery, the chairman of the mine operator, Esmeralda, denied responsibility, claiming that the damage of the spill has been "grossly exaggerated" and that the fish died in such numbers because of lack of oxygen due to the freezing of the river.

A spokesman for the company later claimed that media reports from Hungary and Serbia are politically motivated and the fish were killed by spills from industrial plants along the Tisza, due to the dynamite explosions used to break the ice locks on the river or simply due to the raw sewage pumped into the river.

The Hungarian government called the storing of cyanide next to a river madness and argued that the weather was not unprecedented. A European Union report on the disaster blamed the design faults at the mine.

In mid-February 2000, as the spill reached the Romanian section of the Danube, the Romanian government temporarily banned fishing and the use of Danube water for drinking.

== Legacy ==
Environmental groups, like Friends of the Earth and Greenpeace, argued that the disaster was another reason to ban dangerous mining technologies such as gold mining using the cyanide heap leaching technique.

German metal band Rammstein produced a song about the spill, called "Donaukinder" (Children of the Danube).

Three attempts were made in the Parliament of Romania to ban gold cyanidation in Romania, none of which succeeded.

It also influenced the Protocol on Civil Liability and Compensation for Damage Caused by the Transboundary Effects of Industrial Accidents on Transboundary Waters, which was adopted in Kyiv, Ukraine, in 2003 during the Fifth "Environment for Europe" Ministerial Conference. The Protocol was designed to establish a legal framework for liability and compensation in cases where industrial accidents cause transboundary damage to shared water resources. Although it has been signed by 24 countries, it has been ratified by only one and has yet to enter into force.

== See also ==
- Val di Stava dam collapse
- 1998 Residue dam wall collapse of the Aznalcollar mine
- Ajka alumina plant accident
