= Merriespruit tailings dam disaster =

1994 disaster in Merriespruit, Free State, South Africa

Coordinates: 28°07′52″S 26°50′40″E

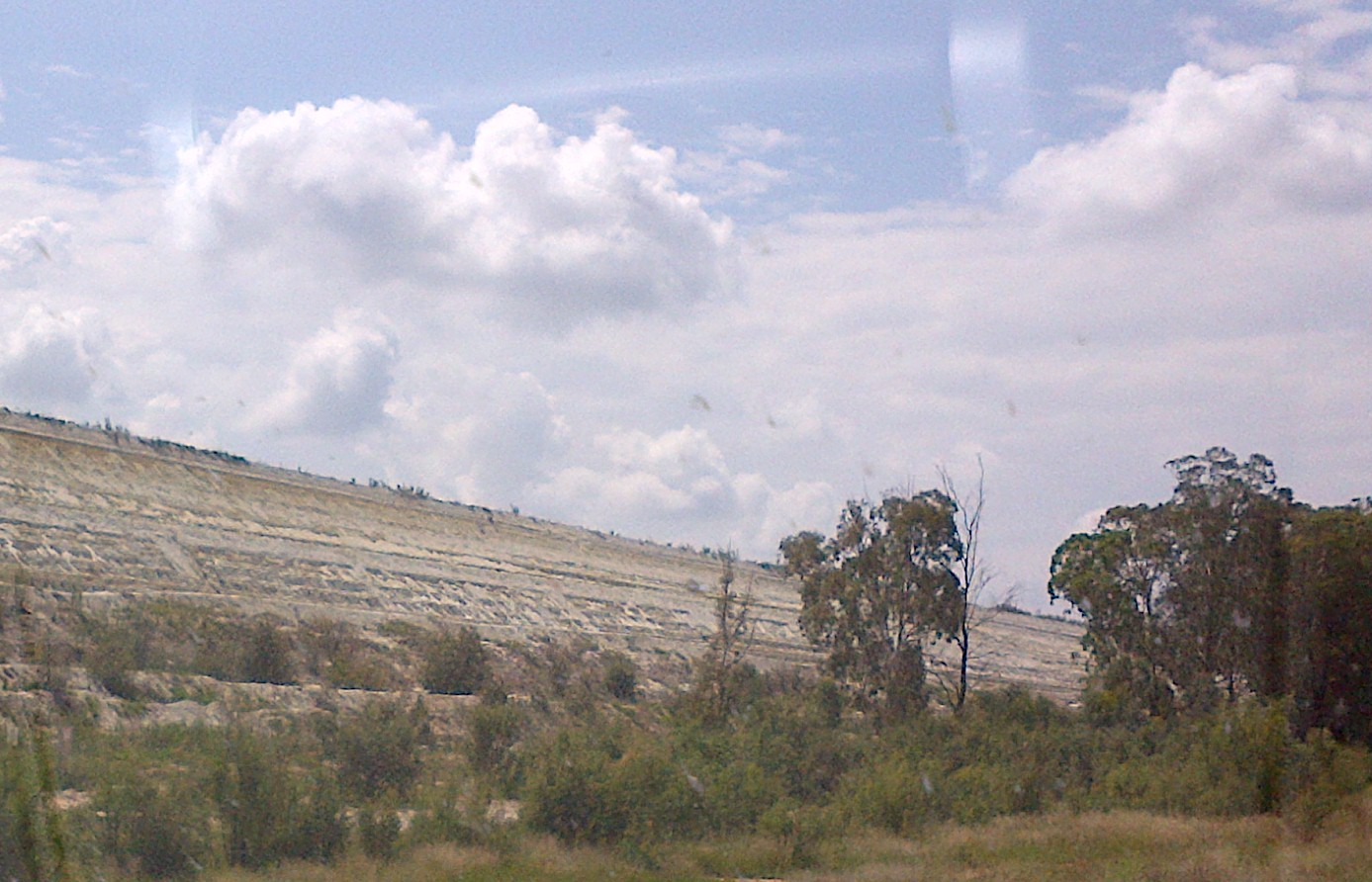
Merriespruit tailings dam

The Merriespruit tailings dam disaster occurred on the night of 22 February 1994 when a tailings dam failed and flooded the suburb of Merriespruit, Virginia, Free State, South Africa. Seventeen people were killed as a result.

Late in the afternoon on the day of the failure, a thunderstorm occurred and about 50 mm of rain fell within 30 minutes. When the dam failed, 600,000 m^{3} of mining sludge flowed 4 km. The nearest houses were located 300 m downslope of the dam; when the wave of water and tailings reached them, it was 2.5 m high.

Seventeen people were killed and there was widespread devastation and environmental damage. Eighty houses were destroyed.

== Background ==
When gold-bearing rock is processed and the gold is extracted, the remaining material is moved to tailings dams as waste, as was the case at the Merriespruit No. 4 facility.

=== Method of construction ===
As is typical with gold tailings in South Africa, the Merriespruit tailing dam was constructed using the "upstream semi-dry paddock" method, where a "daywall" perimeter is constructed and allowed to settle and dry out (typically carried out during the day and supervised) before slurry is placed in the "nightpan" (typically carried out at night without supervision). A penstock is ideally located centrally in the dam and drains water (including stormwater).

=== History of the dam ===
Number 4A in the Harmony Gold Mine tailings complex failed. The dam was designed in the early 1970s by the mine's metallurgical manager and a representative from the tailings dam contractor. The town of Merriespruit, a 250-house suburb of the Goldfields town of Virginia, was already established when the No. 4 dam was started in 1978. The northern wall of the dam was only 320 m from the nearest houses in Merriespruit.

In the early years the slurry had a low relative density that led to difficult construction conditions with seepage and sloughing on the northern wall. A drained tailings buttress was constructed against the face of the northern wall. A single ringmain around the dam was not used, contrary to current practice. A return water dam that could accept water from the dam itself was not provided.

In March 1993 an inspection noticed seepage on the north wall and it was agreed to stop deposition into compartment 4A. According to the contractor, the freeboard at this time was an acceptable 1.0+ m. The division between compartments 4A and 4B was breached some time before the disaster, resulting in drainage from 4B to 4A. The extra drainage led to a freeboard of 300 mm. Despite the termination of daywall construction, deposition of excess plant water containing tailings continued, with the water decanted by the penstock and the remaining tailings using up the remaining freeboard.

Piezometers were installed and the water table established; the contractor calculated the stability factor of safety to be 1.34

The No 4 dam was in an unacceptable condition prior to failure. Contrary to legislative requirements, at the time of failure the dam did not have the capacity to maintain a 0.5 m freeboard during a one-in-100-year 24-hour storm. Satellite imagery showed that water was ponded against the northern wall in February 1994.

== Eyewitness accounts ==
An eyewitness reported a strong stream of water entering the town downstream of the dam at 7:00 pm on the evening of the disaster, which was not the first time such a phenomenon had occurred. One person reported seeing water flowing over the top of the dam wall. When the mining company and contractor arrived at the site that evening, one of the contractor's employees found water lapping the top penstock ring; he then removed rings from the two penstock outlets. Another employee saw blocks of tailings toppling from the tailings buttress. Before they could warn the inhabitants of the town they heard a loud bang as the tailings dam failed and a wave of tailings and water flooded the town.

== Inquiry ==
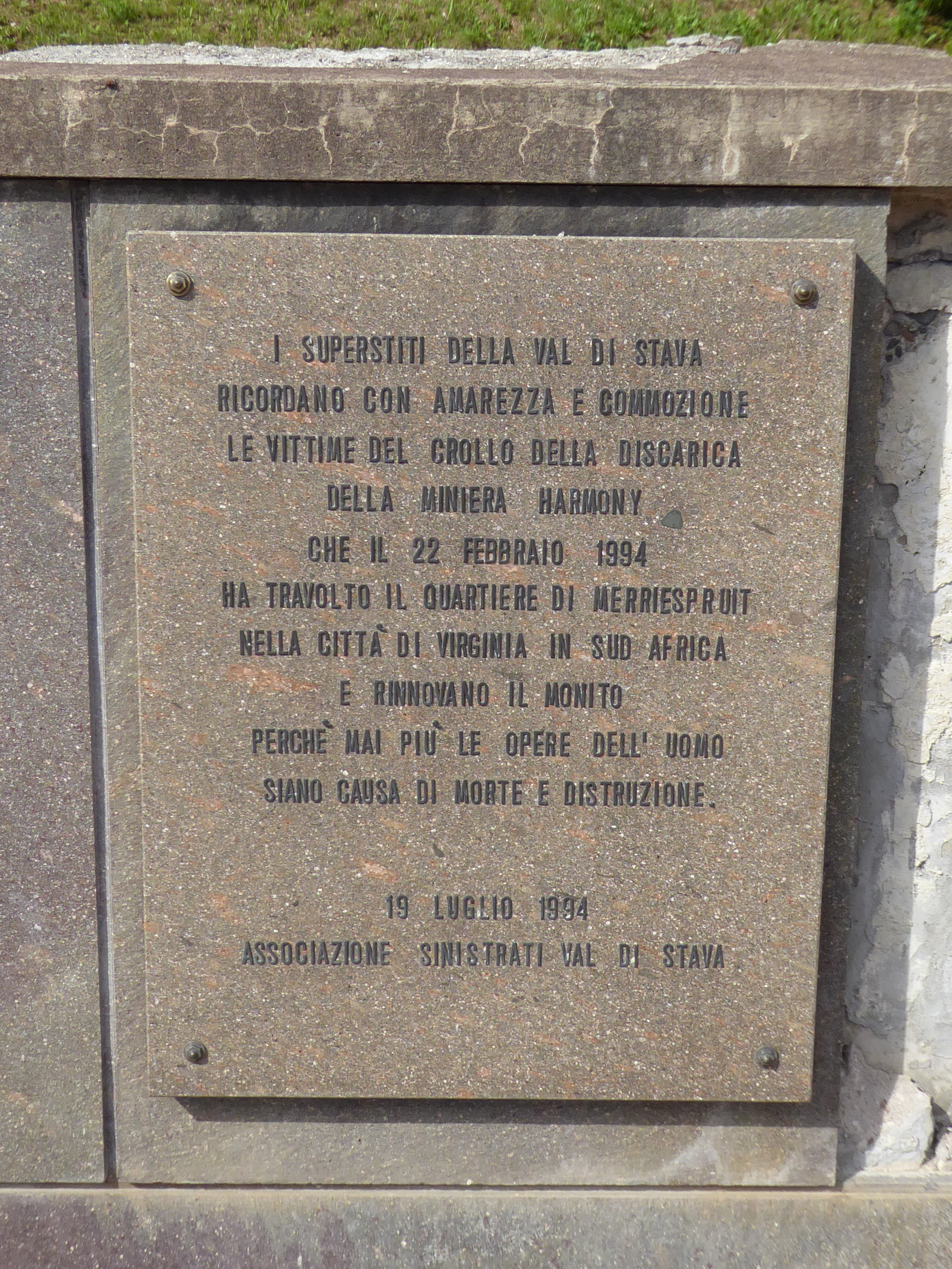
A memorial plaque for the Merriespruit disaster in the cemetery of the victims of the Stava Valley disaster, in Tesero (Italy); the text translates as: "The survivors of the Stava Valley commemorate with bitterness and emotion the victims of the collapse of the Harmony tailing dam, which on 22nd February 1994 crushed the quarter of Merriespruit in the city of Virginia in South Africa, and they renew the admonishment that never again the works of the man become cause of death and destruction"

Separate investigations were carried out by the owner, the operator, and the State.

A joint inquest/inquiry was run, with a judge appointed by the Minister of Justice. The State conducted investigations including looking at eyewitness accounts, weather and hydrological data, laboratory and in situ tailings testing, satellite imagery, and overtopping studies using a scale model. The mine and the contractor managing the tailings were found responsible for the disaster. The inquiry led to the introduction of a new Code of Practice for Mine Residue Deposits.

The judge described the dam as a time bomb waiting to explode.

The owner, operator and six of their employees were found guilty of negligence and heavy fines were imposed. It was discovered that economic pressure had led to a reduction in personnel related to the tailings dam, the metallurgical manager's direct management of the dam was reduced due to time constraints, and personnel had been promoted to positions for which they did not have adequate experience.

The South African government appointed the Council for Scientific and Industrial Research to investigate, which confirmed the conclusions reached; as a result the 1995 Draft Code of Practice for the Design, Operation, and Closure of Tailings Dams was introduced.

== Consequences ==
Public awareness of the threat of tailings dams led to community pressure preventing an application for expansion for a tailings dam within 1 km of houses in Fleurhof in 1992. The operator, who is also responsible for the majority of tailings dams in South Africa, appointed qualified staff and implemented a hazard-management strategy for every tailings dam.
