= Certeju de Sus =

- Commune
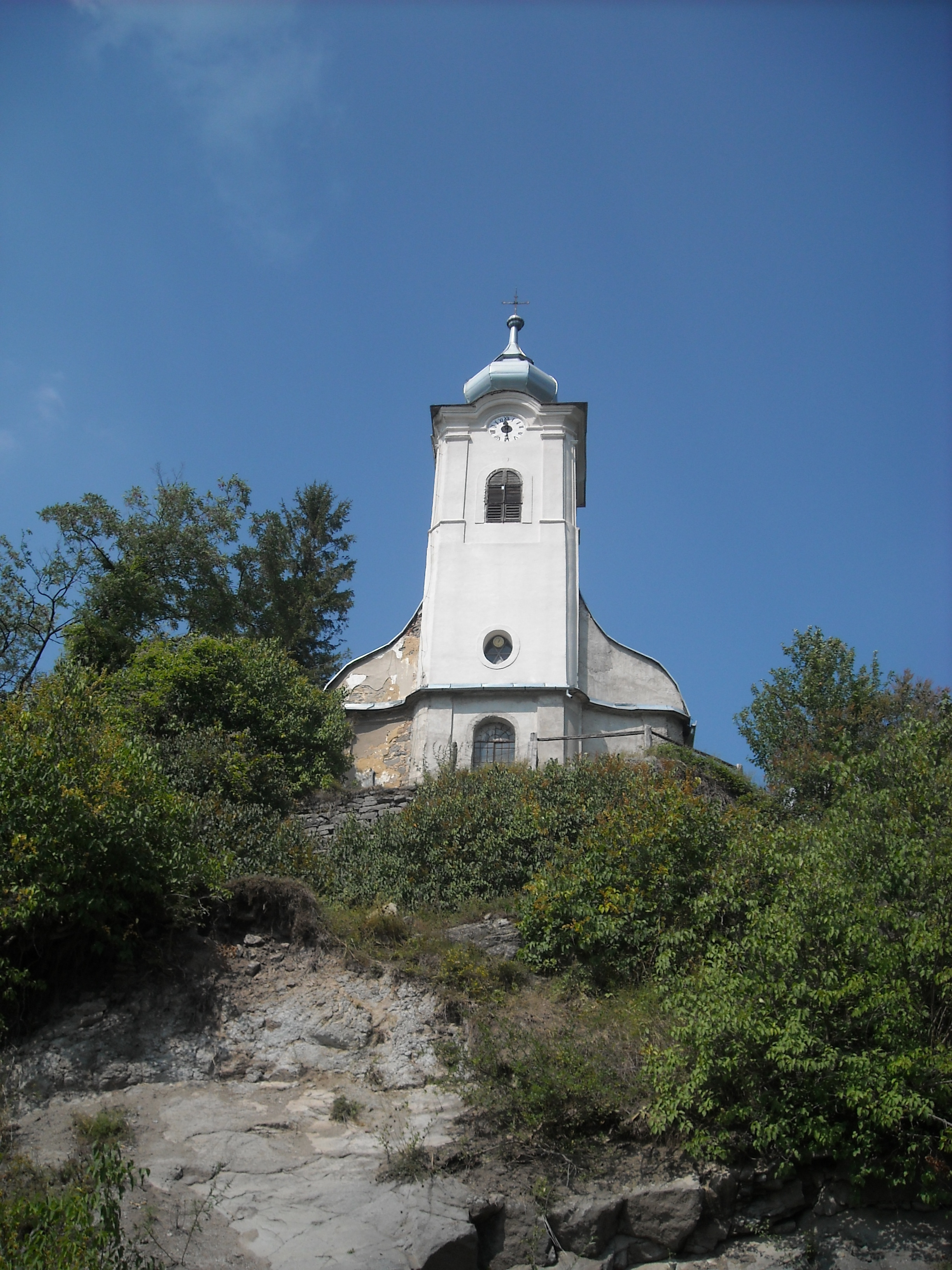
- Roman Catholic church in Săcărâmb

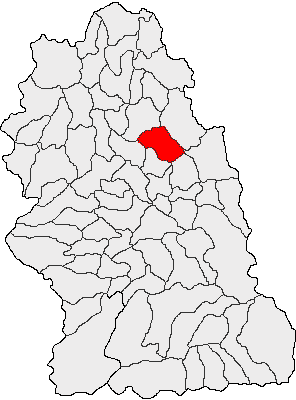
- Location in Hunedoara County

- Location in Romania
- Coordinates: 45°58′N 22°58′E
- Country: Romania
- County: Hunedoara

Government
  - Mayor (2024–2028): Alexandru Luca (PSD)
- Area: 89.65 km^{2} (34.61 sq mi)
- Elevation: 285 m (935 ft)
- Population (2021-12-01): 2,870
  - Density: 32.0/km^{2} (82.9/sq mi)
- Time zone: UTC+02:00 (EET)
  - Summer (DST): UTC+03:00 (EEST)
- Postal code: 337190
- Area code: (+40) 02 54
- Vehicle reg.: HD
- Website: www.certejudesus.ro

Certeju de Sus (Hungarian: Felsőcsertés) is a commune in Hunedoara County, Transylvania, Romania. It is composed of nine villages: Bocșa Mare (Boksatelep), Bocșa Mică, Certeju de Sus, Hondol (Hondol; German: Hondolen), Măgura-Toplița (Magura), Nojag (Nozság), Săcărâmb (Nagyág; Gross-Astdorf), Toplița Mureșului (Toplica), and Vărmaga (Vormága).

The commune is located in the central part of Hunedoara County, about 15 km (9.3 mi) north of the county seat, Deva. It is situated in the southern foothills of the Metaliferi Mountains, on the banks of the river Certej. It is the site of the Certej Mine and of the 1971 Certej dam failure.

Historical population
Year	Pop.	±%
1850	7,066	—
1900	5,782	−18.2%
1941	4,802	−16.9%
2002	3,456	−28.0%
2011	3,126	−9.5%
2021	2,870	−8.2%
Source: Census data

== Natives ==
- Ioan Moța (1868–1940), Romanian Orthodox priest, nationalist politician, and journalist
