= Khambhāt =

City in Gujarat india

Khambhāt Cambay
- City
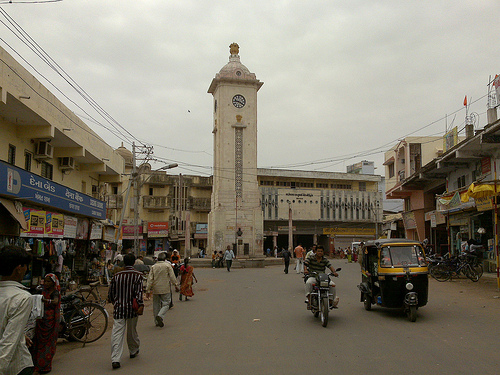
- Tower Road, Khambhat
- Nickname: Trambavati Nagari
- Location within Gujarat
- Coordinates: 22.3°N 72.62°E
- Country: India
- State: Gujarat
- District: Anand

Government
  - Type: Nagar Palika

Area
  - Total: 2,932.9 km^{2} (1,132.4 sq mi)

Population (2011)
  - Total: 99,164 (M+OG)
  - Density: 620/km^{2} (1,600/sq mi)

Languages
  - Official: Gujarati
- Time zone: UTC+5:30 (IST)
- PINs: 388620, 388625, 388630, 388540
- Telephone code: 02698
- Vehicle registration: GJ 23
- Website: khambhatnagarpalika.in

Khambhāt (/ˈkʌmbət/; Gujarati: [kʰəmbʱɑt]), also known as Cambay, is a city and the surrounding urban agglomeration in Anand district in the Indian state of Gujarat. It was once an important trading center, but its harbour gradually silted up, and the maritime trade moved to Surat. Khambhāt lies on an alluvial plain at the north end of the Gulf of Khambhāt, noted for the extreme rise and fall of its tides, which can vary as much as thirty feet in the vicinity of Khambat. Khambat is known for its halvasan sweet, sutarfeni, akik stone and kites (patang), and for sources of oil and gas.

Khambhāt is perhaps the only place in India where the Harappan craft of agate bead making is found in the living tradition. Surprisingly Khambhāt has no stone deposits; the craft has survived mainly through acquiring stones from the Rajpipla hills, about 200 km away from the city. Khambhat has historically been an important centre of Jainism, and contains several old Jain temples and collections of Jain palm-leaf manuscripts. In the folklore of Khambhāt, the beginning of the craft is attributed to Baba Ghor, a 1500 AD saint from Ethiopia (Habash) who had led a large contingent of Muslims (Siddi) to settle in the city. However, in the archaeological record the origin of the craft can be traced to nearby Lothal, a Harappan outpost that flourished about 4000 years ago.

== Toponymy ==
=== Origin of name ===
Some people believe that the City of Khambhāt may be the Camanes of Ptolemy. James Tod believed that the name comes from the Sanskrit Khambavati or 'City of the Pillar'.

=== Variants of name ===
- Cambay

==== Historical ====
- Cambaet of Marco Polo
- Cambaia of Duarte Barbosa
- Cambeth of Marino Sanudo
- Trambavati of Tod
- Kambáya
- Combea
- Quambaya
- Camanes of Ptolemy

== History ==
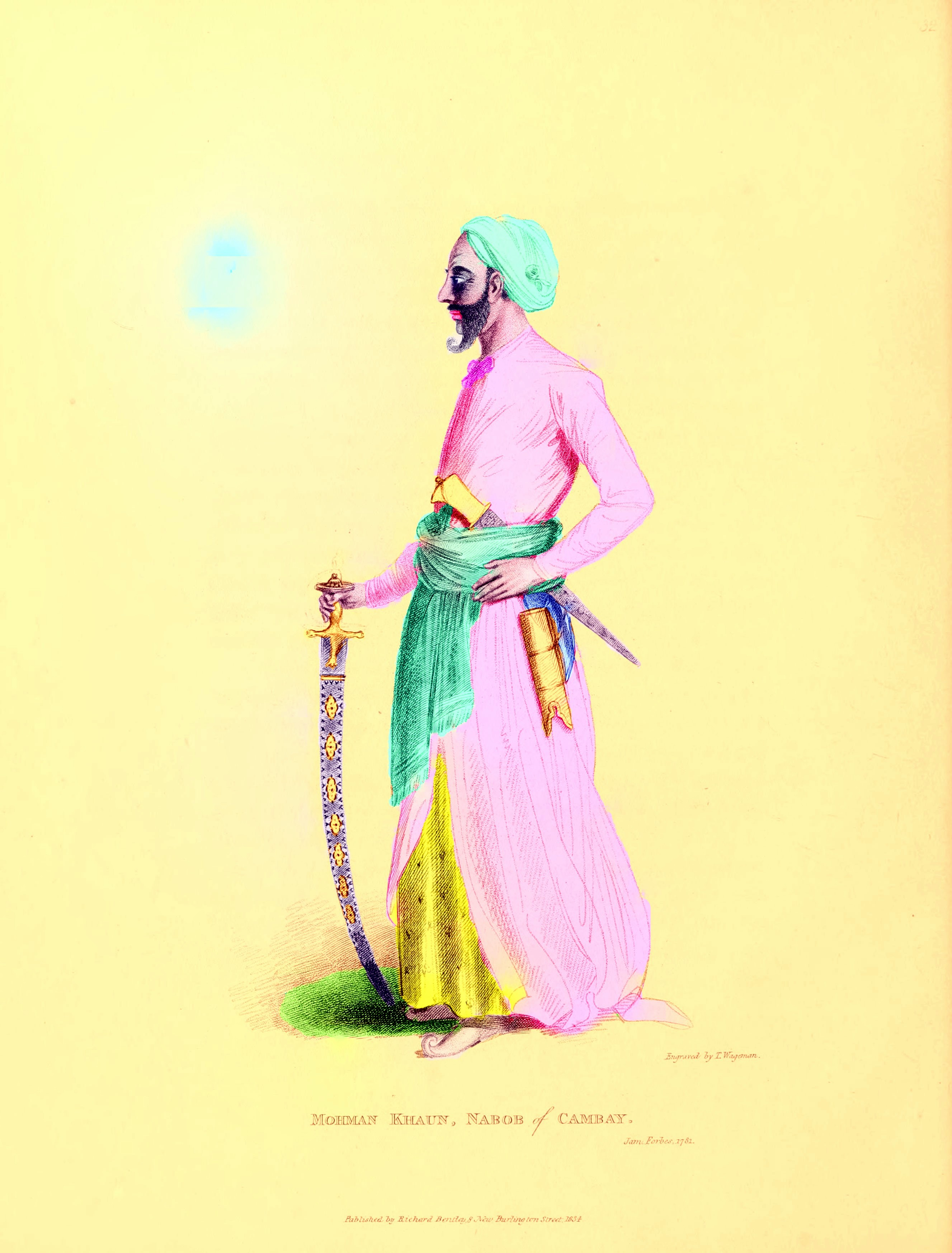
Mohman Khan Nawab of Cambay

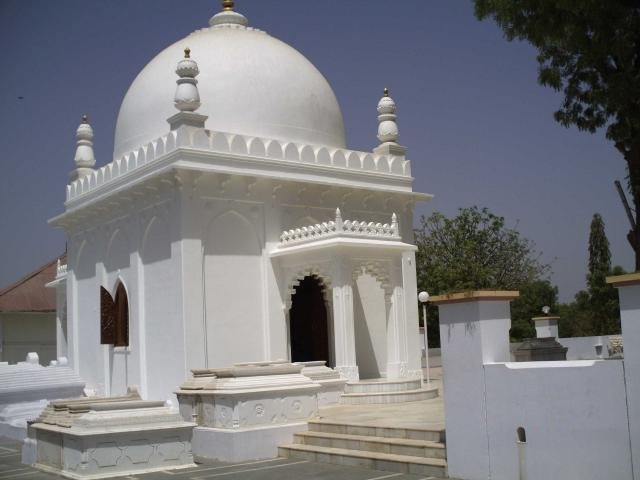
Mausoleum of 1st Wali–ul–Hind Moulai Abdullah, Khambat, Gujarat, 1050AD-1100AD.

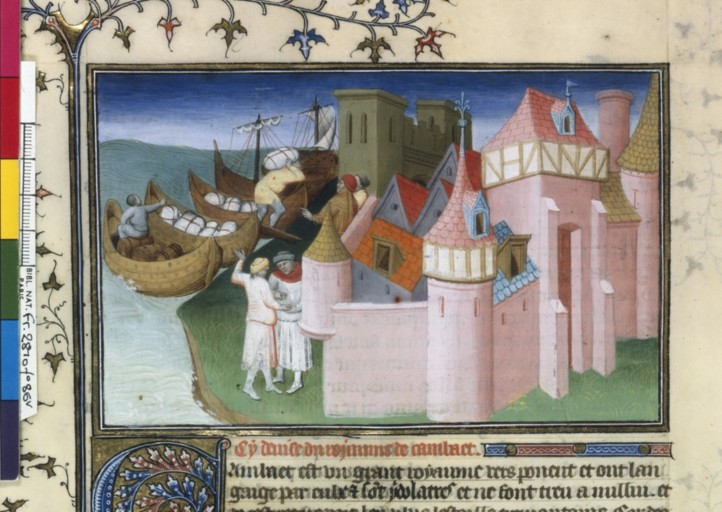
The city of Cambay was an important Indian manufacturing and trading center noted by Marco Polo and illustrated here in the 15th century.

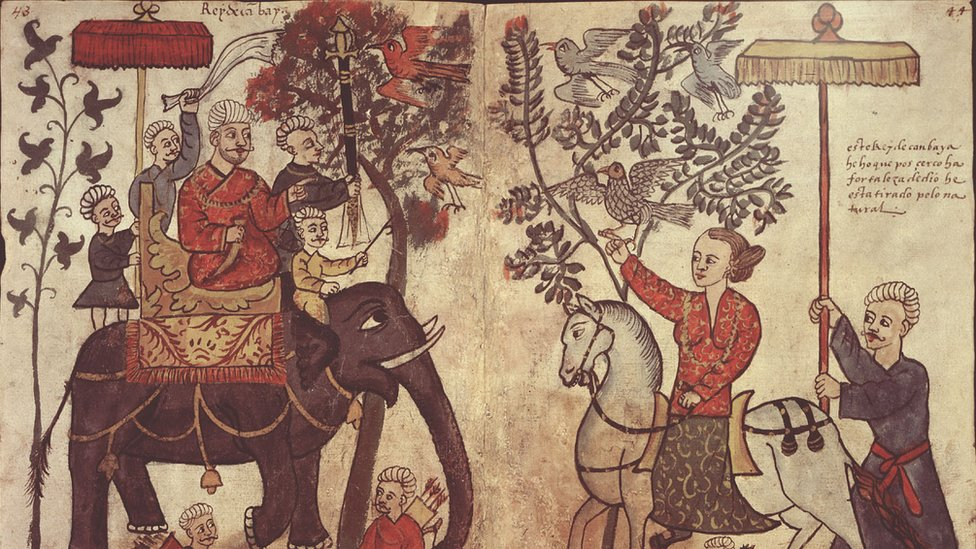
The king of Cambay (in present-day Gujarat) from "Figurae variae Asiae et Africae," a 16th-century Portuguese manuscript in the Casanatense Library in Rome (Codex Casanatense 1889).

Cambay was formerly a flourishing city, the seat of an extensive trade, and celebrated for its manufactures of silk, chintz and gold stuffs. The Arab traveler al-Mas'udi visited the city in 915 AD, describing it as a very successful port; it was mentioned in 1293 by Marco Polo, who, calling it Cambaet, noted it as a busy port. He mentions that the city had its own king. Indigo and fine buckram were particular products of the region, but much cotton and leather was exported through Cambay. In the early 1340s, the Moroccan traveller Ibn Battuta remarked on its impressive architecture and cosmopolitan population.

"Cambay is one of the most beautiful cities as regards the artistic architecture of its houses and the construction of its mosques. The reason is that the majority of its inhabitants are foreign merchants, who continually build there beautiful houses and wonderful mosques -- an achievement in which they endeavour to surpass each other."

An Italian traveler, Marino Sanudo, said that Cambeth was one of India's main two ocean ports. Another Italian, visiting in about 1440, Niccolò de' Conti, mentions that the walls of the city were twelve miles in circumference.

The Portuguese explorer Duarte Barbosa visited the city, which he calls Cambaia, in the early sixteenth century. His description of the city is very full. He states:

"Entering by Guindarim [Gandhar port, Bharuch], which is within on the river, there is a great and fair city called Cambaia in which dwell both 'mouros' [Muslims] and 'gentios' [Hindus]. Therein are many fair houses, very lofty, with windows and roofed with tiles in our manner, well laid out with streets and fine open places, and great buildings of stone and mortar."(translation of)

He describes the city as very busy and affluent, with merchants coming frequently by sea from the world around. Duarte Barbosa also noted that many ships from the Kingdom of Cambaya sailed to the Sultanate of Mogadishu in the Horn of Africa with cloths and spices for which they in return received gold, wax and ivory.

Owing principally to the gradually increasing difficulty of access by water by the silting up of the gulf, its commerce has long since fallen away, and the City became poor and dilapidated. The spring tides rise upwards of 30 ft (10 m) and in a channel usually so shallow that it is a serious danger to shipping. By 1900, the trade was chiefly confined to the export of cotton. The City was celebrated for its manufacture of agate and carnelian ornaments, of reputation, principally in China.

The houses in many instances are built of stone (a circumstance which indicates the former wealth of the city, as the material had to be brought from a very considerable distance); and remains of a brick wall, three miles (five km) in circumference, which formerly surrounded the City, enclose four large reservoirs of good water and three bazaars. To the southeast there are very extensive ruins of subterranean temples and other buildings half-buried in the sand by which the ancient City was overwhelmed. These temples belong to the Jains and contain two massive statues of their deities: one black, the other white. The principal one, as the inscription intimates, is Pariswanath or Parswanath, carved in the reign of the emperor Akbar; the black one has the date of 1651 inscribed.

A few members of Shia community settled in Khambhāt during 18th century from Iran. Among these the most known was Nawab Mohammed Jaffar Ali Khan Najamesani and his son Nawab Yavar Ali khan Najamesani. Nawab Yavar Ali khan Najamesani ruled 84 villages when he was crowned as a Nawab. Nawab Yavar Ali Khan was titled Sarkar Sahab (Governing Prince), because he was able to maintain peace and unity. The name Cambay to Khambhat was also given by Nawab Yavar Ali Khan during Pre-independence period. Nawab Yavar Ali Khan died in July 1996. His family still lives in Khambhat.

=== Hub of mercantile activity ===
The traders and the merchants reached here from across the world. Cambay was known for its cotton and silk cloths. Cambay was one of India's most active trade center since the 14th century (Source: Ibn Battuta). After 200 years, Duarte Barbosa described Cambay as an important commercial center with carpets, and other textile goods in Mughal established industries.

==== Cambay cloth ====
Cambay was famous for its cloth manufacturing and trading activities. There were certain coarse cotton cloths which were called Cambay cloth. For instance, the checked cloths. There are records of extensive trading of Gujarati Cambay cloth.

=== Princely State of Cambay ===
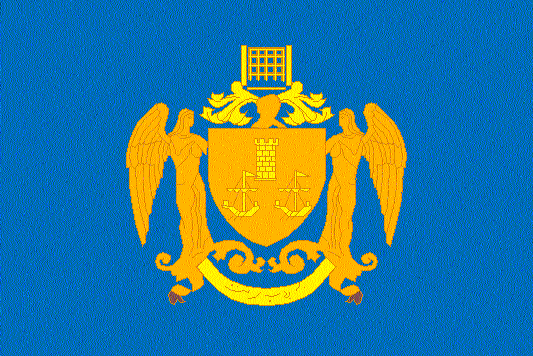
Cambay flag of Royal family of Nawab Jaffar Ali Khan najamesani.

Khambat was the capital of Cambay State, a princely state of British India. It was the only state in the Kaira Agency of the Gujarat division of the Bombay Presidency. It had an area of 350 sq mi (910 km^{2}). It was founded in 1730, at the time of the dismemberment of the Mughal Empire. The Nawabs of Cambay were descendants of Mumin Khan, the last of the Mughal governors of Gujarat, who in 1742 defeated his brother-in-law Nizam Khan, governor of Khambhat, and established himself there.

The sport of cricket in India was first played in Cambay State in 1721.

In 1780 Cambay was taken by the army of general Goddard Richards, but it was restored to the Marathas in 1783. Finally it was ceded to the British by the Peshwa under the treaty of 1803. The state was provided with a railway in 1901.

== Geography and Climate ==
Khambhāt is at 22.3°N 72.62°E. It has an average elevation of 8 metres (26 ft).

Khambhāt has warm and humid climate. It is located on the plains. The land on which Khambhāt sits is the silt deposited by the Mahi River, so Khambhāt has very fertile, wet coastal alluvial soil. The area south of Khambhat is muddy wetlands and then coast line comes. Normally April to June is summer. From July, it rains until September. It has a muggy climate for most of the year except winters. Sometimes Khambhat receives heavy rain, and surrounding areas get affected from floods in the Mahi River. Mid November to January is winter, which results in essentially mild cold during the nights and early mornings with warm noons. Maximum average temperatures are 25 to 30 °C (77 to 86 °F) and minimum average temperatures are 10 to 12 °C (50.0 to 53.6 °F). Summer average maxima are 38 °C or 100.4 °F and minima around 22 °C or 71.6 °F. In summer, high winds are common. Khambhat coast's tides are among the highest in the world at up to 35 feet or 10.7 metres.

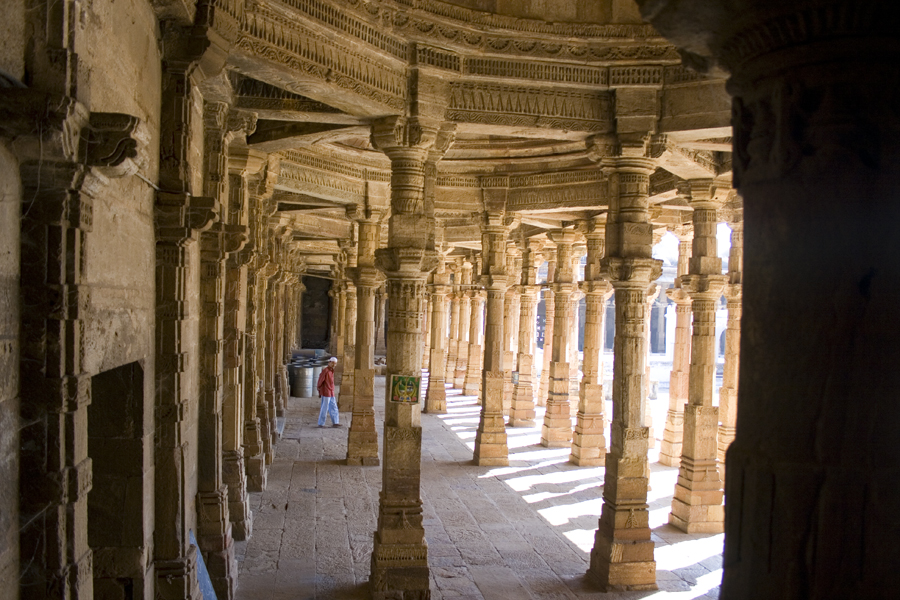
Creative artwork in a mosque built over a temple ruins

== Demographics ==
As of 2011 India census, Khambhāt had a population of 201,964. Males constitute 52% of the population and females 48%. Khambhat has an average literacy rate of 73%, higher than the national average of 59.5%: male literacy is 78%, and female literacy is 67%. In Khambhat, 10% of the population is under 6 years of age.

According to the 2011 Census of India, Hinduism was the largest religion in Khambhat, followed by Islam and Jainism. Hindus constituted 72.88% of the population, Muslims 23.87%, and Jains 2.50%; Christians, Sikhs, Buddhists and other communities made up the remainder.

== Economy ==
In the 14th and 15th centuries, Khambhāt was well known for Muslim gravestones carved in marble which were exported to various locations along the Indian Ocean rim, including Southeast Asia.

Many here are in the agate business, diamond cutting-polishing and colored stone business (mainly ruby), and have shops which sell eatables and household products. Kite making is another important business in the City among few particular communities. Fishing and salt harvesting are other businesses some particular communities are occupied with.

== Transport ==
=== Railway ===
Khambhāt is connected with Anand by Railway Line. Total 8 trains depart per day for Anand.

=== Road ===
Khambhāt is connected with Ahmedabad, Kheda, Tarapur, Dharmaj, Vataman, Petlad, Nadiad, Anand (State Highway 16 of Gujarat)

Bus Service (GSRTC)

Khambhāt is well connected to Ahmedabad by GSRTC Bus service route called Ahmedabad - Khambhat.(Via Kheda, Matar, Tarapur) Daily Service To Connect Mega City Of Gujarat.

== Schools ==
- Adarsh Saraswati Vidhya Mandir, NAGRA
- Bits Education High School
- Chachaldeep Vidyavihar, NANAKALODRA
- Dr. J.B. Patel Primary School, ALING
- Harsh Balvatika, NANAKALODRA
- Jalsan High School, JALSAN
- Kendriya Vidyalaya ONGC (CBSE)
- Lok Jagruti High School
- M.T. High School
- Madhavlal Shah High School
- Metpur High School
- N.A. Patel Shishuvidhyalay, NANAKALODRA
- RC Mission School
- S.B. Vakil Primary School (English Medium)
- S.D. Kapadiya High School
- Shree S.K. Vaghela High School
- Shree S.Z. Vaghela High School (Science + Common Stream)
- Smt. B.C.J. High School, JALUNDH, PIPLOI
- Smt. K.M.J. Patel High School, SAYAMA (Arts + Commerce Stream)
- St Xavier's High School (Science + Common Stream)
- Supath High School
- Vatsalya International School

== Colleges ==
- L.B. Rao Institute of Pharmaceutical Education
- Nav Jagruti Arts & Commerce College for Women
- R.P. Arts, K.B. Commerce & B.C.J. Science College
- Shri M N College of Pharmacy
- Smt. B.C.J. College of Education
- Vatsalya Institute of Nursing

== Tourism ==
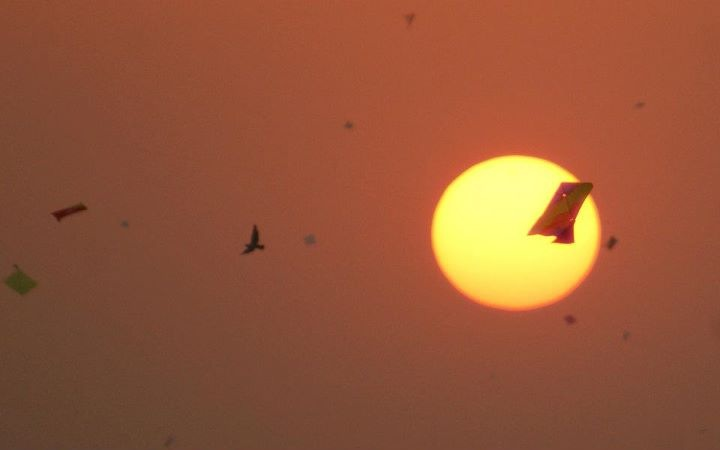
Uttarayana at Khambhat

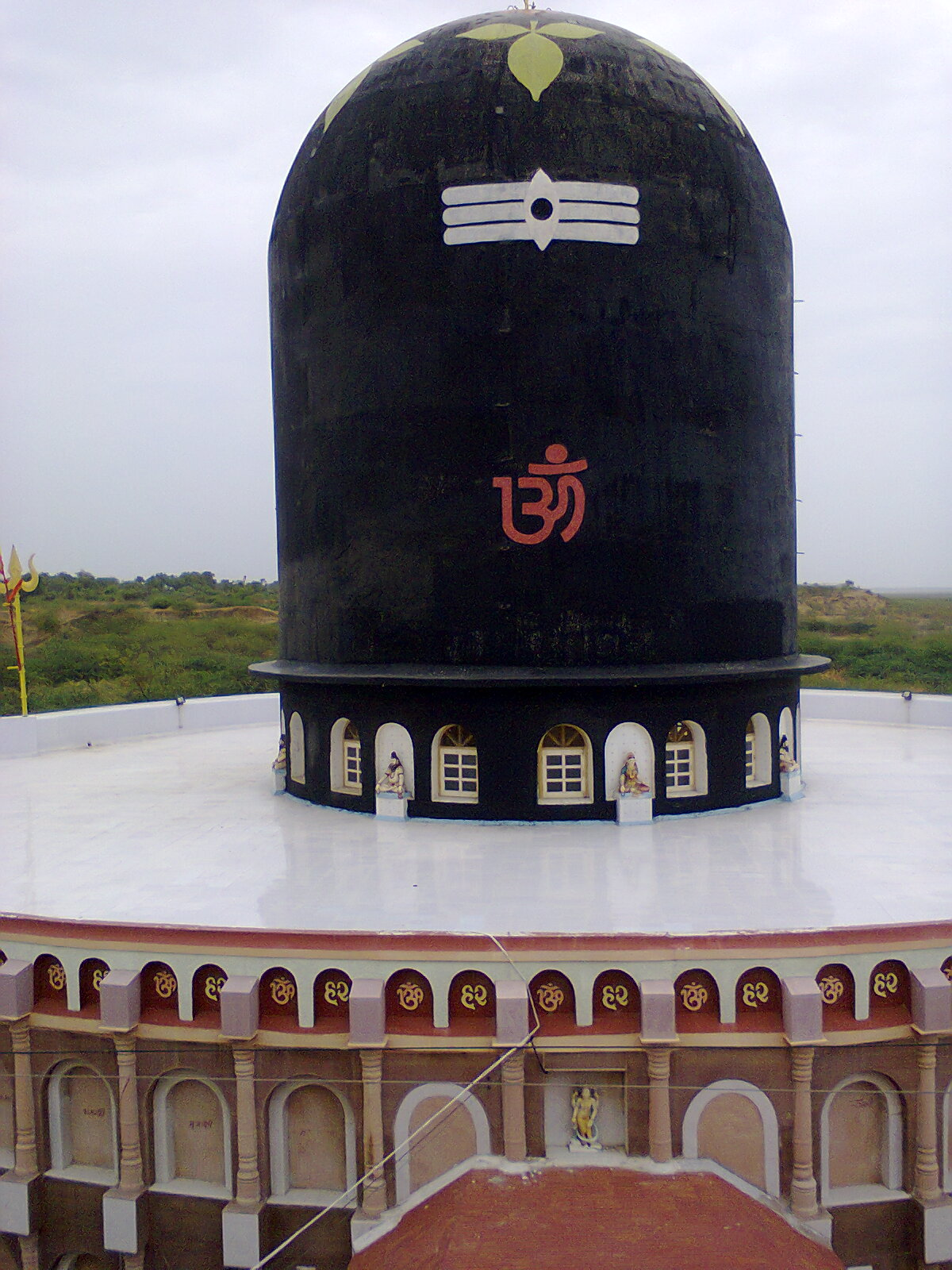
Shivling, Ralaj, Khambhat

- Babu Shah Baba [Hazarat Sayyed Asaduddin Chishti r.a.]
- Dariyai Uttarayana (Organized on first Sunday after Uttarayana at Seashore)
- Jain Derasar
- Jami Masjid
- Saiyed Miran Ali and Wali
- Sikotar Mata Mandir, Ralaj
- Swaminarayan Mandir
- Neja

== Marine archeology ==
In May 2001, India's Union Minister for Human Resource Development, Science and Technology division, Murli Manohar Joshi, announced that the ruins of an ancient civilization had been discovered off the coast of Gujarat, in the Gulf of Khambhat. The site was discovered by NIOT while they performed routine pollution studies using SONAR, and was described as an area of regularly spaced geometric structures. It is located 20 km from the Gujarat coast, spans 9 km, and can be found at a depth of 30–40 meters. In his announcement, Joshi represented the site as an urban settlement that pre-dates the Indus Valley civilization. However, these claims were made without the backing of any experts and have since been debunked by prominent archaeologists.

== See also ==
- Gulf of Khambhat
- Khambatta
