= Chautar =

Old muslin cloth of Mughal period

Chautar or Chaotaer (Cotton cloth) is an old cotton fabric of the Mughal period. The chautar was a mulmul variety, and the finest mulmul was termed as "Mulmul Shahi" in Hindi and Persian languages. It was produced in Eastern India. Way back, Chittagong was exporting this cloth. Conceivably these cloths were produced in smaller pieces only since the Chautar is described as a piece good. It has been recorded with specific dimensions, i.e., length 12.44 meters and width 77.75 centimeters. Chautar was compared with sansuo, which was a three shuttle cloth, type of fine cotton variety produced at Songjiang.

== Cloths with similar names ==
"Chowtars" (means four wires) were characterised as cloth made with four warp and weft threads on both sides. "Chautahi" a "four folded cloth" was a quality more often used in the Punjab region.

== Special mentions ==
- Ma Huan a Chinese voyager also referred Chautar. In the 1431 expedition, he visited Bengal, Chittagong, Sonargaon, Gaur and Calicut. From Calicut, he was sent by Eunuch Hong Bao as emissary to Mecca.
- Abu'l-Fazl ibn Mubarak, one of the nine Jewels of Akbar's royal court, mentioned this fabric the Ain-i-Akbari.The Chautar was very much light and thin. They used it to strengthen the paper by inserting one layer between the two layers of paper.

== See also ==
Mughal Karkhanas

Ain-i-Akbari

Panchtoliya
