= Khadodhi =

Khadodhi (Village ID 517058) is a village which is nearby Dhuvaran in the mandal of Khambhat, Anand, Gujarat, India. According to the 2011 census it has a population of 5749 living in 1147 households.
