= Worshipful Company of Girdlers =

Livery company of the City of London

Coordinates: 51.51704°N 0.09064°W

- Arms of the Worshipful Company of Girdlers
- Motto: Give Thanks To God
- Location: Girdlers' Hall, Basinghall Avenue, London EC2V 5DD
- Date of formation: 1449; 577 years ago
- Company association: Leather industries
- Order of precedence: 23rd
- Master of company: Angus Maitland
- Website: www.girdlers.co.uk

The Worshipful Company of Girdlers is one of the Livery Companies of the City of London.

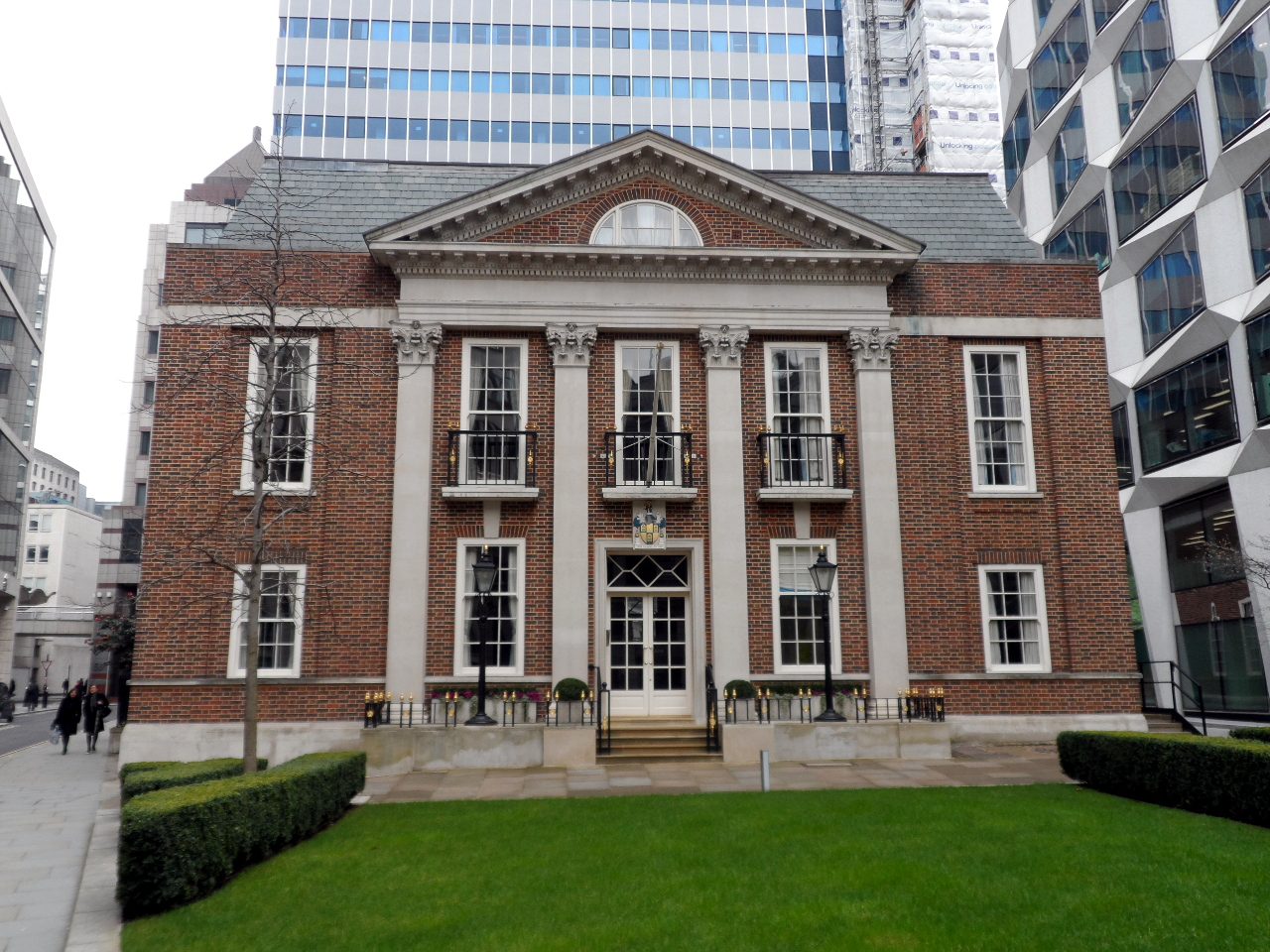
Girdlers' Hall in Basinghall Avenue in the City of London

Girdlers were granted the right to regulate their trade in the City from 1327 and obtained a Royal Charter in 1449. Girdlers, or makers of belts and girdles, are no longer closely related to their original trade. Along with the products of many other Livery Companies, girdles have become less important than in medieval times. However, the Company continues its long tradition as a charitable body.

The Girdlers' Company ranks twenty-third in the order of precedence among City Livery Companies. The Company's motto is Give Thanks To God.

== See also ==
- Girdler's carpet
