= Khambatta =

Khambatta is an Indian Parsi toponymic surname from Khambhat, Gujarat. Notable people with the surname include:

- Persis Khambatta (1948–1998), Indian model, actress and author
- Piruz Khambatta, owner of Rasna
