= Girdler's carpet =

Carpet

The Girdler's carpet, or Girdler's Mughal carpet), is a Mughal carpet (handwoven floor covering). The carpet was ordered by Robert Bell from the Mughal Karkhanas royal workshops in Lahore in 1634. The carpet was given to the Worshipful Company of Girdlers. It was a floral carpet with the dimensions of 27 feet x 8 feet. This carpet is still in the possession of the company, in Girdlers' Hall, London.

The Girdler's carpet is one of the best-documented examples of Mughul carpet weaving. Mughal Carpets were woven at Agra, Lahore, and Fatehpur Sikri.
