= Panchtoliya =

Lightweight cotton fabric used for veils

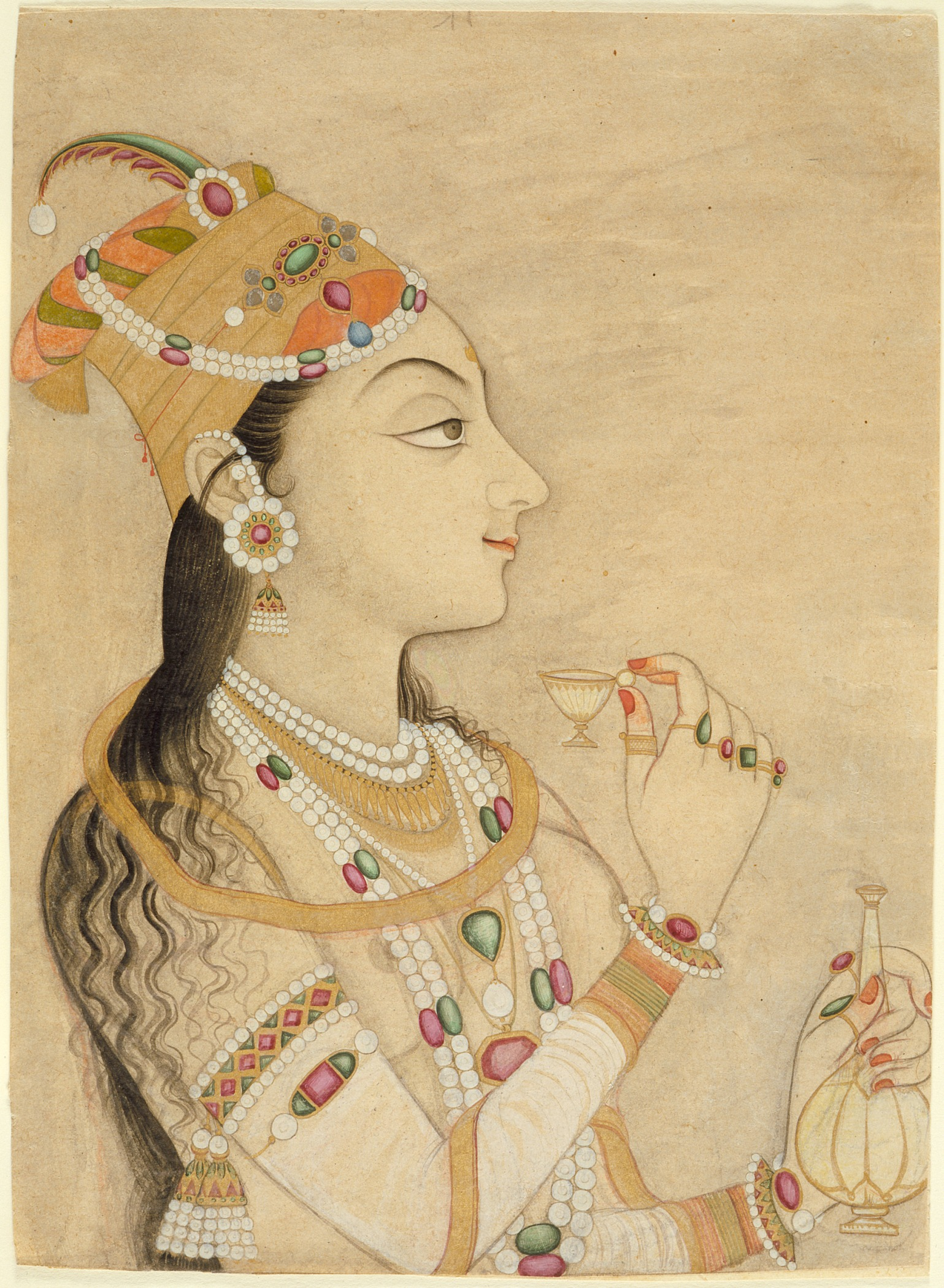
Idealized Portrait of the Mughal Empress Nur Jahan (1577–1645)? LACMA M.81.271.7

Panchtoliya was an old cotton cloth of the Mughal period. The Panchtoliya was very light in weight and used for the veil. It was weighing only 2-5 tola (one tola is 10 grams) per piece. The credit of Panchtoliya goes to the Mughal empress Nur Jahan. She was very fashion enthusiastic, encouraged, and introduced many styles and varieties of cloths of her interest. Few examples are Panchtoliya, badla (silver-threaded brocade), kinari (silver-threaded lace), and Dudami ( a flower-patterned muslin, used for gowns) weighing just two dams. Nur Jahan is also credited for specific dresses. For instance, nurmahali for the wedding is one of them.

== Mentions ==
Abu'l-Fazl ibn Mubarak mentioned Panchtoliya in Ain-i-Akbari with a price of 1-3 Muhr.

== See also ==
- Muslin
- Nur Jahan
- Mughal Karkhanas
