= Mughal carpets =

Floor coverings during Mughal Empire

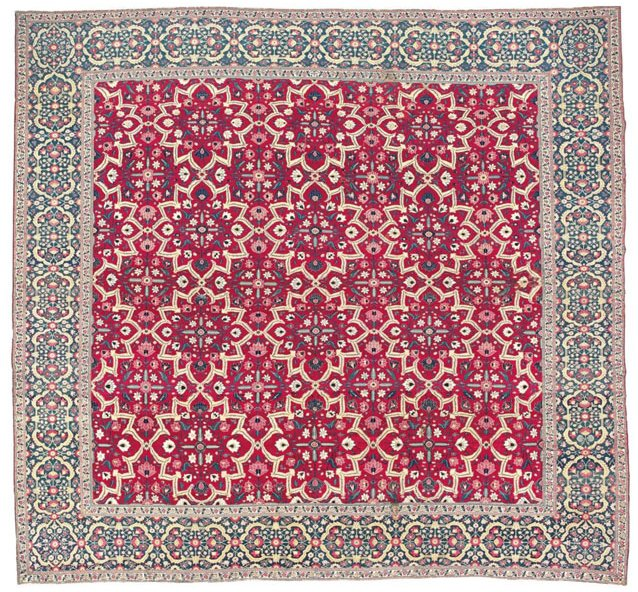
Mughal Carpets

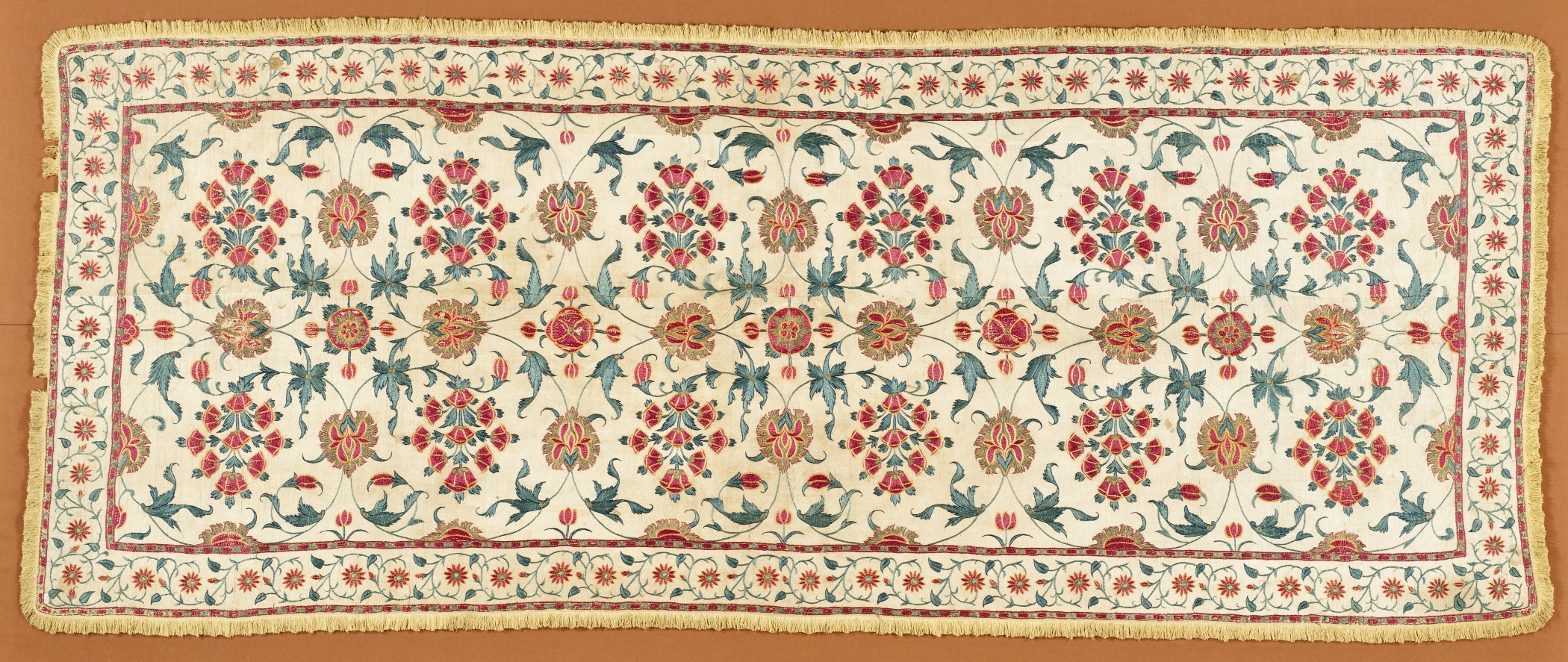
India, Mughal, 18th century Textiles; carpets Cotton plain weave with silk chain stitch embroidery, wrapped metal thread with silk core, and silk quilting 112 3/4 x 44 3/4 in. (286.39 x 113.67 cm) From the Nasli and Alice Heeramaneck Collection, Museum Associates Purchase (M.79.9.6) Costume and Textiles

Mughal carpets (Moghul or Mogul carpets) were the handwoven floor coverings used in the Mughal Empire in their courts. Mughal carpets and rugs have their roots in India since the 16th and 17th centuries. Mughal carpets were a blend of Persian and Indian artistry uniquely designed with scenic landscapes, floral, and animal patterns. Kashmir was producing the finest wool and silk carpets and rugs, including prayer rugs. Sometimes the knot density in these rugs was so fine and tight as 300 knots per square centimeter.

The Mughal emperors were enthusiastic about textile materials, especially the third Mughal emperor Akbar who set numerous imperial workshops across India. He also arranged training of local artisans to improve the skill. In addition to textile, the manufacturing of carpets was an important industry.

== Production ==
Mughal carpets are thought to have been produced in various locations, including Agra, Lahore, and Fatehpur Sikri. The karkhanas of carpet, rugs, tents, and various other floor coverings was called Farrash khana.

In the Mughal period, the production of carpets went beyond being merely an economic pursuit. Instead, it was intricately connected with the refined preferences of the royalty, societal traditions, and the artistic principles cherished within the Islamic realm.

== Farsh-i-chandani ==
Nur Jahan is credited with popularizing farsh-i-chandani, a sandalwood-colored carpeting style, which gained widespread popularity throughout the country during her reign. Heinrich Blochmann characterised it with a sandalwood hue, whereas Samsam ud Daula Shah Nawaz Khan referred to it as a silvery carpet.

Farsh-i-chandani was also used in Mughal Harem. The elegantly embellished ceiling and floor colors of the tomb of I'timād-ud-Daulah offer a glimpse into the potential aesthetics of the Farsh-i-Chandani carpet, which is associated with Nur Jahan's distinctive fashion sensibility.

== Special Mentions ==
The Girdler's carpet is one of the best-documented examples of Mughul carpets.

== See also ==
Girdler's carpet

Mughal Karkhanas
