= Aqeeq =

Stones used in jewellery

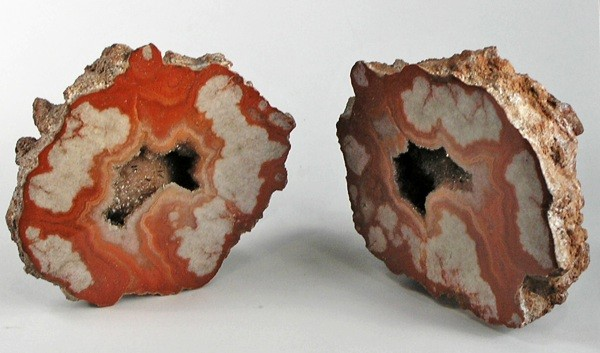
A geode of chalcedony richly colored by hematite that gives it its rusty hues and marks it as Akik

Aqeeq, akik or aqiq (Arabic: العقيق, 'quartz' in Arabic, 'agate' in Turkish), is an Arabic or Turkish term referring to quartz or agate, but in the context of rings usually refers to a ring set with a chalcedony stone. Well-known types of chalcedony are carnelian, agate, and onyx. It is considered a semi-precious gemstone, and rings set with golden-orange variety of carnelian or sard have special significance in the Islamic religion.

== Jewellery preparation ==
A stone is ground into shape (often a cabochon or a short, wide cylinder) and polished to a shine. Sometimes the flat surface is engraved with a religious motto in Arabic, which is sometimes inlaid with gold. The finished gem is then mounted on a ring according to the stones finished size. Both men and women wear aqiq rings as jewellery.

== Islamic significance ==
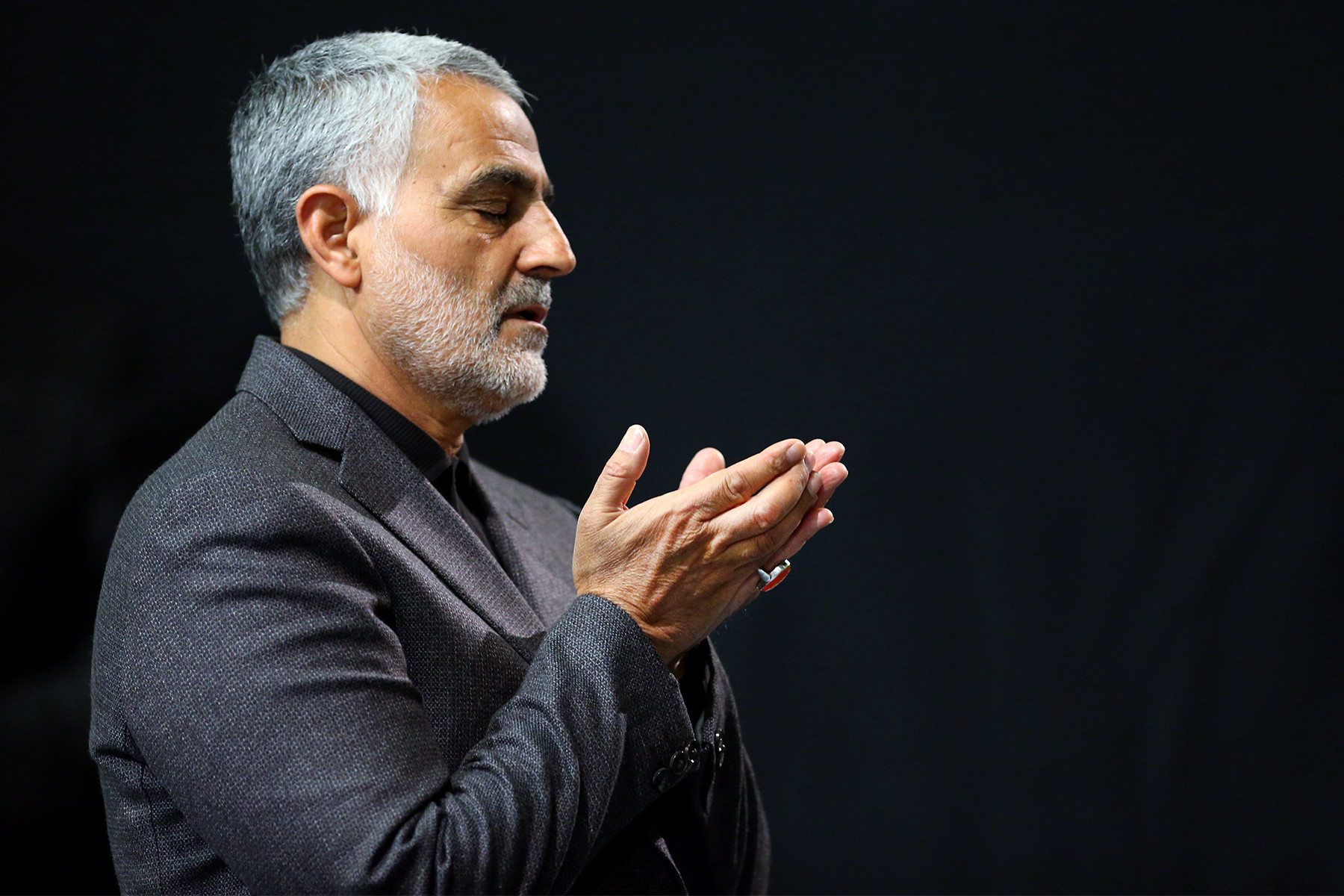
Qasem Soleimani wearing an aqeeq ring

An aqeeq ring also has religious importance in Islam as it is considered sunnah to wear one. The Prophet Muhammad is said to have worn a carnelian/aqiq ring set with silver as a commemoration of the removal of idols from the Grand Mosque in Mecca in 630 CE. Many Muslims do the same, including both Shia and Sunni clergy.

== Gallery ==
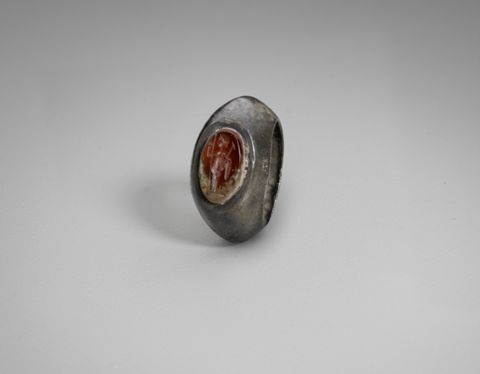
A silver ring set with a carnelian seal carved with a standing figure, circa 100–256 CE

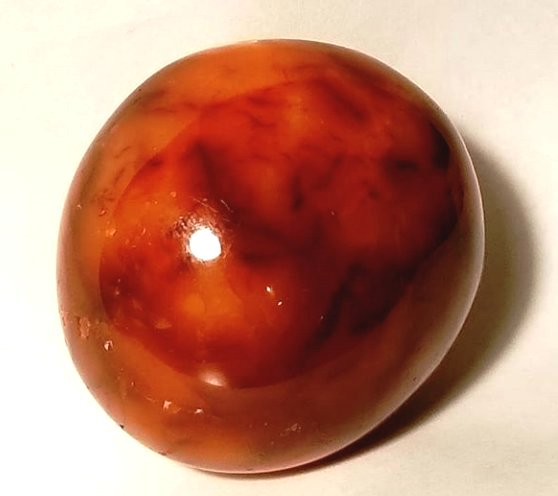
A tumbled carnelian (golden-orange chalcedony, coloured by iron oxide impurities)

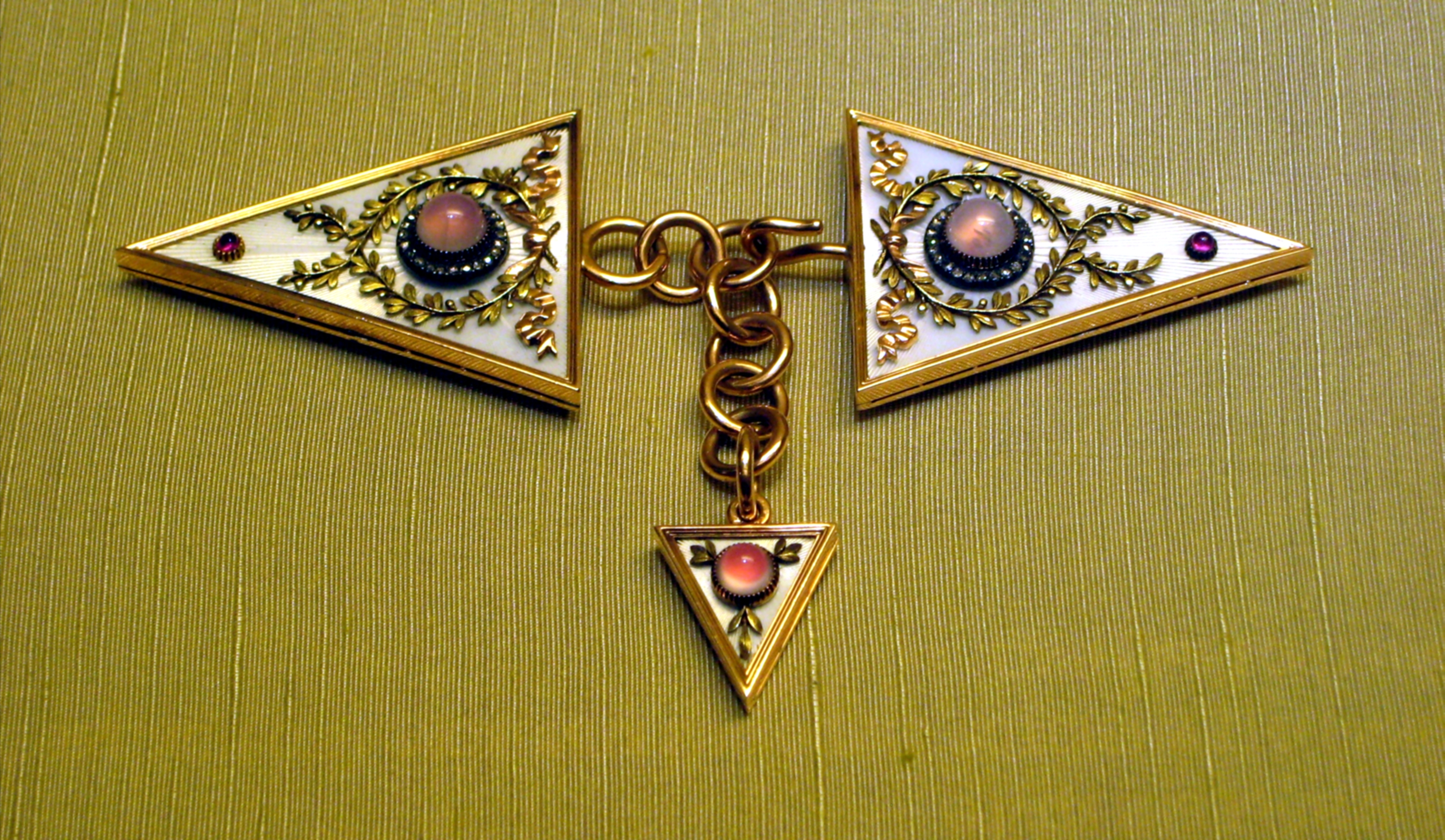
A 1903 cape clasp, with chalcedony, diamonds, rubies, gold and enamel, worked by jewelry master G. Wigström for Faberge

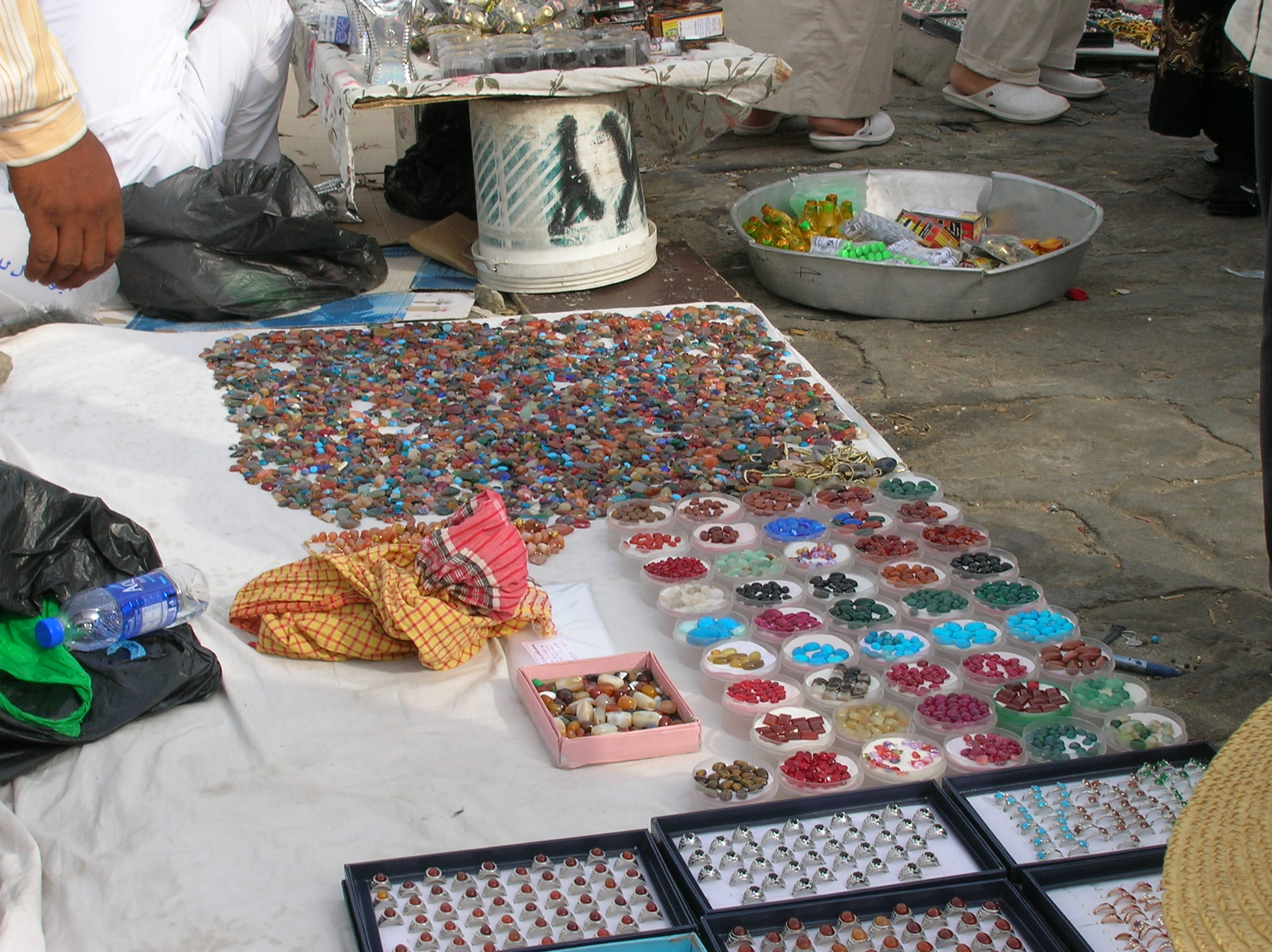
Akik stones and rings in many colours, sold at the summit of Mount Arafat in Mecca
