= Mughal Karkhanas =

Mughal manufacturing houses and workshops in South Asia

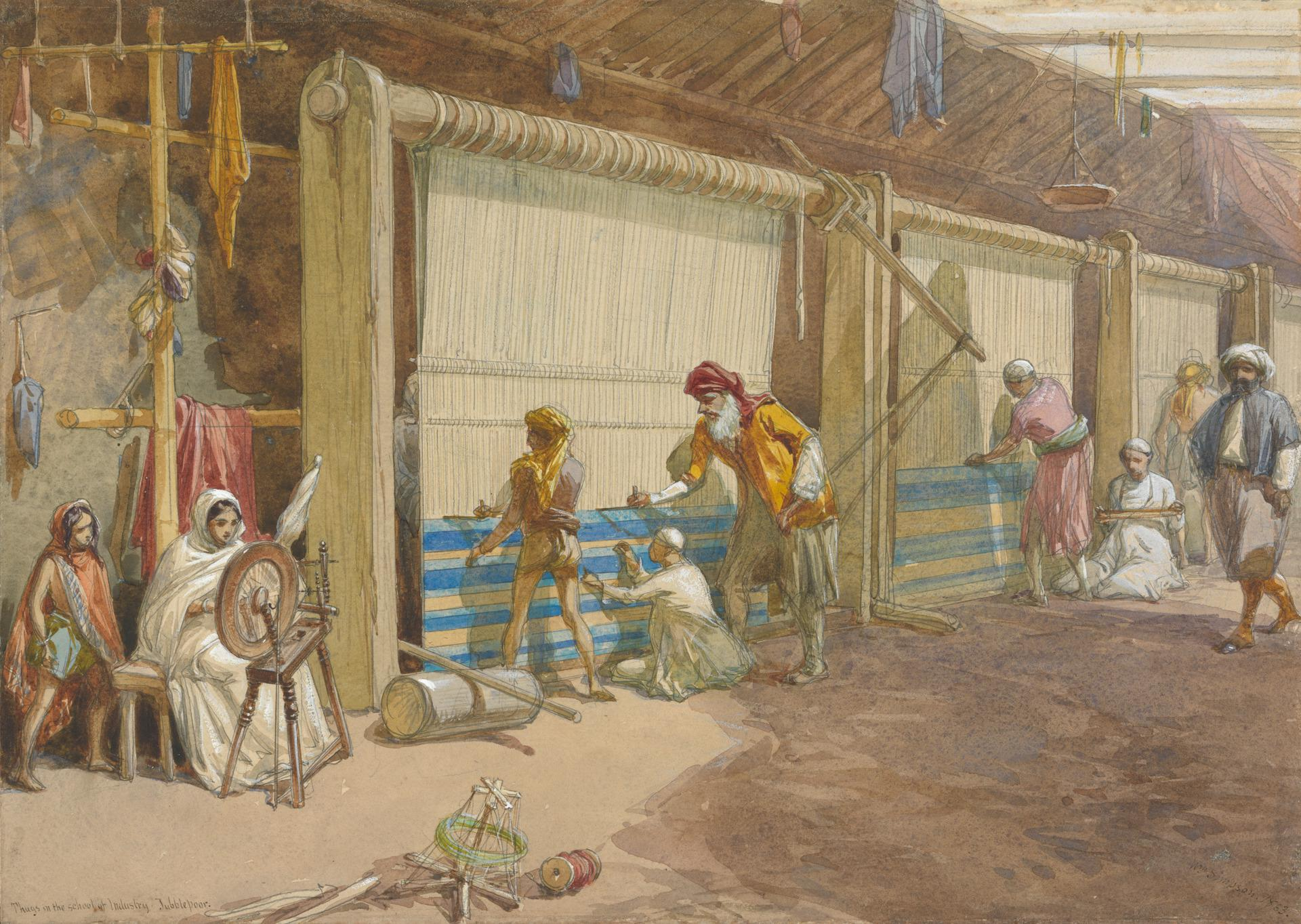
Indian workers making Cotton

Mughal karkhanas (Hindi: कारखाना, Karkhana, Karkana kārakhānā, Kar-kanyas, Qur khana, Urdu: کارخانہ) were the manufacturing houses and workshops for craftsmen, established by the Mughals in their empire. Karkhana is a Hindi and Marathi language word that means factory. These karkhanas were small manufacturing units for various arts and crafts as well as for the emperor's household and military needs. karkhanas were named and classified based on the nature of the job. For example, 'Rangkhana' and 'Chhapakhana' were for textile dyeing and printing work. The term 'tushak-khana' was used to describe workshops that made shawls and embellished them with embroidery or needlework. Imperial or Royal Karkhanas were for luxury goods and weapons. The karkhanas were the place for various production activities and also for the exploration of new techniques and innovations. Some operations such as weaving, embroidery work, and brocade work were often done under one roof, resembling an integrated assembly line.

== Karkhanas ==
Karkhanas in the Mughal era especially in Akbar's time were much more organized and large as compared to the Sultanate period. Mughals raised the standards of karkhanas attained previously by the Sultans under various dynasties. Mughals viewed administrative matters with great sincerity and maintained proper hierarchy in the system, for instance, the Mansabdari system founded by Akbar. The Mughal empire was divided into "Subah" which were further subdivided into "Sarkar", "Pargana", and "Gram.", additionally there were three methods of revenue collection i.e. Kankut, Rai And Zabti. In the Mughal empire, rapidly accelerating urbanization and the vast army size (required to properly administer such a large region), necessitated the large-scale production of weapons and other goods. Hence there were large establishments of Royal Karkhanas.

=== Administration ===
Karkhanas were the manufactories and storehouses that operated largely to fulfill state requirements. These were places where the artisans were supposed to do their work as per the command (following the controllers' orders) unlike the artisan system (where there was considerable freedom and independent control over the manufacturing process). Royal Karkhanas employed various artisans specializing in different crafts.

Karkhanas were maintained by the state, nobles, mansabdars, and zamindars. One tahvildar, along with a 'Darogah' and a superintendent, was engaged at every Karkhana. The khan-i-saman was the designation for the head of the royal karkhanas or workshops. The administrators were supposed to present the best of the crafts to the emperor in compliance with the set protocols. Hence, engaging the best artisans was absolutely necessary. As per the Ain-i-Akbari, there were 36 classified karkhanas. Notably, one noble Bakhtawar established karkhanas at Delhi, Agra, Lahore, and Buharanpur.

=== Accounts ===
Karkhanas operated much like the present day organized sector albeit with state funding, materials were supplied at pre-determined cost by the state, and the profit- loss accounts were maintained for each individual Karkhana. There are records (of Amber rulers who were the nobles of Mughals) related to royal karkhanas explaining various accounts (heads) such as jama kharch, arhsatta, Tozi, Tozi (taujih) jama kharch topkhana, palkikhana, shutarkhana, zinkhana. 'Jama' and 'Kharch' are the words for incoming and outgoing entries in the account. Various other relevant terms mentioned in the records are:-

- Jama kharch a treasury account formerly kept (the monthly receipts and disbursements).
- Arhsatta is the revenue record.
- Tozi (are the records on separate sheets) for the different state workshop and warehouses, the commodities manufactured and the wages given to the workers.
- Tozi Jama Kharch -Topkhana is a statistical information in fine details about the daily expenditure incurred on the raw material, wages, repairing of the arms.
- Silekhana is about the accounts of Silehaposh (Combatants).
- Shutarkhana is for the shipments received about animals (The Risalas received animal)
- Zinkhana are the records for harness, saddles and bridles.

Large halls are seen at many places, called karkhanas or workshops for the artisans. In one hall, embroiderers are busily employed, superintended by a master. In another, you see the goldsmiths; in a third, painters; in a fourth, varnishers in lacquer-work; in a fifth, joiners, turners, tailors and shoe-makers; in a sixth, manufacturers of silk, brocade and fine muslins … The artisans come every morning to their karkhanas where they remain employed the whole day; and in the evening return to their homes. In this quiet regular manner, their time glides away; no one aspiring for any improvement in the condition of life wherein he happens to be born.

— François Bernier

== Products and types ==
Karkhanas were producing arms, ammunition, and also various items for the court and emperor's need such as clothes, shawls, turbans, jewelry, gold and silverware, perfumes, medicines, carpets, beddings, tents, and for the imperial stable-harnesses for the horses in articles of iron, copper and other metals.

- Silakhana was the Karkhanas for manufacturing arms and arsenal.
- For textile production there were separate Karkhanas for example Chhapakhana and Rangkhana (Printing and dyeing), Toshkhana (shawl making and embellishment work), Kirkarakhana (kurkyaraq khana) (wardrobe).
- Farrash khana (for carpets, floor coverings, rugs, mats and tents)

=== Weapons ===
Karkhans or Royal stores or imperial karkhanas were responsible for producing and storing the required articles for artillery needs, there were about seventy different kind and type of items including heavy guns (cannons), armours, and various types of swords, daggers, spears and lances.

==== Guns ====
Ganzals- a heavy gun which was carried by an elephant and, Narnals, the considerably lighter counterpart, carried by a single man.

==== Swords ====
Khasa, Kotal, Jamadhar, Yakbandi and Khapwas.

==== Armours ====
For sepoys, horses, and elephants.

=== Textiles ===
The third Mughal emperor 'Akbar paid special attention in textiles' and improving the workmanship of local artisans. Fazl wrote

His Majesty pays much attention to various stuffs; hence Irana [Iranian], European and Mongolian articles of wear are in abundance. Skillful masters and workmen have settled in this country, to teach the people an improved system of manufacture. The imperial workshops, the towns of Lahore, Agra, Fatehpur, Ahmadabad, Gujarat, turn out many master-pieces of workmanship; and figures and patterns, knots and variety of fashion which now prevail, astonish experienced travellers. His Majesty himself acquired in a short time a theoretical and practical knowledge of the whole trade; and on account of the care bestowed on them the intelligent workmen of this country soon improved. All kinds of hair-weaving and silk spinning were brought to perfection; and the imperial workshops furnish all those stuffs which are made in other countries. A taste for fine material has since become general, and drapery use at feasts surpasses every description

— An observation of Abu'l-Fazl ibn Mubarak

All the Mughal emperors, including Akbar, Jahangir, and Shah Jahan, took equal interest in manufacturing clothes. Mughal Clothing became a big part of discussion. As per records, Akbar employed eleven thousand tailors for the supply of household goods. Even Nur Jahan was directly controlling a few karkhanas. There were exclusive karkhanas for the royal families, such as karkhanas at Sonargaon, Junglabree, and Bazetpur, producing Malboos Khas (a superior mulmul cloth reserved for the aristocracy and the members of the royal family). Rulers or nobles were directly controlling these karkhanas. Mughal clothing was stitched in these karkhanas from the best-chosen cloths, for instance, silk interwoven with gold and silver. The Ain-i-Akbari mentions various cloths with Zari work brocade, Embroidery from Gujarat, and Bengal. Khasa, Bafta, Gangajal are few of the fabrics given a mention. Karkhanas produced numerous kinds of cotton, silk, and woolen textile piece goods.

==== Remarks ====
François Bernier wrote "the riches and most exquisitely wrought brocades, fine linens and alachas or silk stuffs interwoven with gold and silver"

===== Fabrics and costumes =====
Ain-i-Akbari has described clothes in the imperial wardrobe (toshkhana) along with details such as price, color, and weight. There are thirty-five items listed in the order of precedence. Abu'l-Fazl ibn Mubarak explicitly informs about the imperial workshops for court needs situated at Lahore, Agra, Fatehpur Sikri, and Ahmedabad. The skilled artisans had their training from Persian or Turkistan trainers and then produced higher quality artistic work in local royal karkhanas. Akabar's special interests resulted the major transformation in the field of design, formerly imported stuffs from abroad could then be made in the royal workshops.

Mughal clothing was characterized by luxurious styles and was made with muslin, silk, velvet and brocade. Elaborate patterns including dots, checks, and waves were used with colors from various dyes including cochineal, sulfate of iron, sulfate of copper and sulfate of antimony were used.

==== Cotton ====
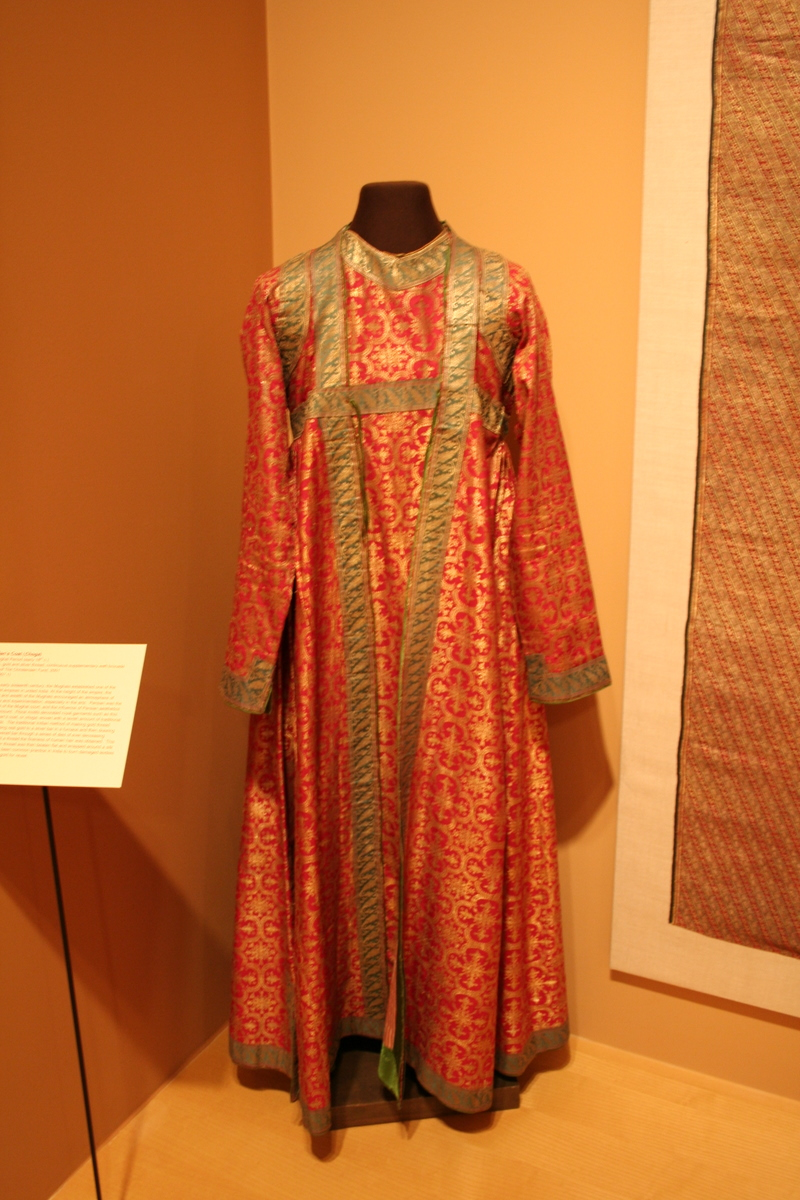
Mughal era coat

Cotton had the highest share in the textiles, including calicos, muslins, available unbleached and in a variety of colors. Cotton contributed a large part of the empire's international (Europe) trade. The production of cotton goods was across India. Coarser cotton goods have majored in western sides (Gujrat and Punjab), and fine cotton goods were renowned of the east of medieval India. Bengal emerged as the foremost muslin exporter in the world.

The Indian subcontinent produced varieties of cotton cloths, especially fine muslins between the 16th to 18th centuries. The seven explicitly mentioned cloths are khasa, Salu, Doriya, Bafta, Dupatta, and Panchtoliya, named in the exhaustive list of cotton cloths in Ain-i-Akbari.

===== Fine muslins =====
In 1586 Ralph Fitch remarked that in Sonargaon, just fifteen miles east of Dhaka, there is the best and finest cloth made of cotton that is in all India

— Remarks of Ralph Fitch consultant for the British East India Company

Khasa, Tansukh, Nainsook, Chautar, and types of Mulmul (Sarkar ali, Sarbati, Tarindam)

===== Other cotton materials =====
Abu'l-Fazl specifies the cotton fabrics of Khandesh in Ain-i-Akbari. He refers three cotton varieties in which 'Abasteh' is the fine cotton 'Sarisaf' and 'Bhiraun' were ordinary. He also appreciated the Chautar and Khasa of Saharanpur. The calicos of Calicut, muslins of Dhaka, Chintz of Machilipatnam, and Baftas of Baroch and Cambay, cotton piece goods and cloth of gold of Burhanpur, Surat and Vadodara were famous.

=== Silk ===
Silk and wool was also significant but not in comparison to cotton. For selected silk, the raw materials were also imported from china. Silk weaving was an important industry in Varanasi, Agra and Gujrat.

=== Wool ===
Wool was limited to the particular areas such as Kashmir and Punjab.

=== Shawls and carpets ===
==== Shawl ====
Shawl, an article of loose clothing, was among the symbol of Mughal royalty. The Mughals improved not only the production but also the techniques of the craft of shawl making in Kashmir. The number of looms was grown to 40000. Royal workshops (karkhanas) introduced new colors and patterns, enhanced the shawl industry, which earned wealth and prosperity for Kashmir.

==== Mughal carpets ====
Mughal carpets were a blend of Persian and Indian artistry. They were uniquely designed with scenic landscapes, floral, and animal patterns. Kashmir was producing the finest wool and silk carpets and rugs, including prayer rugs. Sometimes the knot density in these rugs was so fine and tight as 300 knots per square centimeter. Carpet weaving was renowned in Agra, Lahore, and Fatehpur Sikri. The Girdler's carpet is one of the best-documented examples of Mughul carpets.

===== Brocade and Embroidery =====
Mughals admired Zardozi work on their costumes; this supported Karkhanas. Mughal ladies' favorite were embellished clothes with brocade, and various embroidery. There were a variety of options such as, Kantha, Kimkhwab, Chickankari, kashida, phulkari, etc. The city of Amritsar was one of several centers of fine embroidery in the Punjab.

=== Painting workshops ===
There were exclusive workshops maintained for paintings also.

== Wages ==
Wages were paid to artisans and the unskilled labor on a daily basis, and only regular employees, whether craftsmen or domestic servants, received their pay monthly. The wages of skilled workers were notedly more in the Imperial karkhanas. As described in the Ain-i-Akbari (c.1595), which is an official account of the Mughal Empire. Abu'l-Fazl ibn Mubarak (the grand vizier of the Mughal emperor Akbar, and author of the Akbarnama) explained the detailed wages for all such categories, and also stated invariably in copper coins when daily rates are quoted.

== End ==
It is important to observe, that of this vast tract of country, a large portion is extremely fertile; the large kingdom of Bengale (Bengal), for instance, surpassing Egypt itself, not only in the production of rice, corn, and other necessaries of life, but of innumerable articles of commerce which are not cultivated in Egypt; such as silks, cotton, and indigo. There are also many parts of the Indies, where the population is sufficiently abundant, and the land pretty well tilled; and where the artisan, although naturally indolent, is yet compelled by necessity or otherwise to employ himself in manufacturing carpets, brocades, embroideries, gold and silver cloths, and the various sorts of silk and cotton goods, which are used in the country or exported abroad. It should not escape notice that gold and silver, after circulating in every other quarter of the globe, come at length to be swallowed up, lost in some measure, in Hindustan.

— Bernier's description of both agriculture and craft production.

=== The rise, succession, despotism ===
The Karkhanas was one of the significant revenue-making establishments of Mughals. Textiles of India flourished under the Mughal Empire. Textiles became the largest manufacturing industry then. The emperors acquired lot of wealth in trade but the artisans and peasants' condition was not improving. All profits were for the governmental bodies.

=== The fall ===
Luke Scrafton, resident for the East India Company at the capital of Bengal in 1758, declared that until the invasion of Nader Shah in 1739 "there was scarce a better administered government in the world. The manufactures, commerce, and agriculture flourished exceedingly; and none felt the hand of the oppression but those who were dangerous by their wealth or power."

— Luke Scrafton, Reflections on the Government of Indostan (London, 1770).

The fall of Karkhanas correlated with the fall of the Mughals has many reasons.

Still, major were the successive ruling and changes in administration and corruption at various levels of hierarchy. The corruption has risen since the reign of Jahangir. They were relatively weak thus government affairs went into the hands of the unscrupulous ministers. They maintained a large number of servants, slaves, horses, elephants, etc. Bernier wrote about the Mughal tyranny and made the prophecy of the decline of the Mughal Empire, but Bernier could not visualize that the worst is yet to come and the British will be the next masters of the wealthiest part of the globe.

== Gallery ==
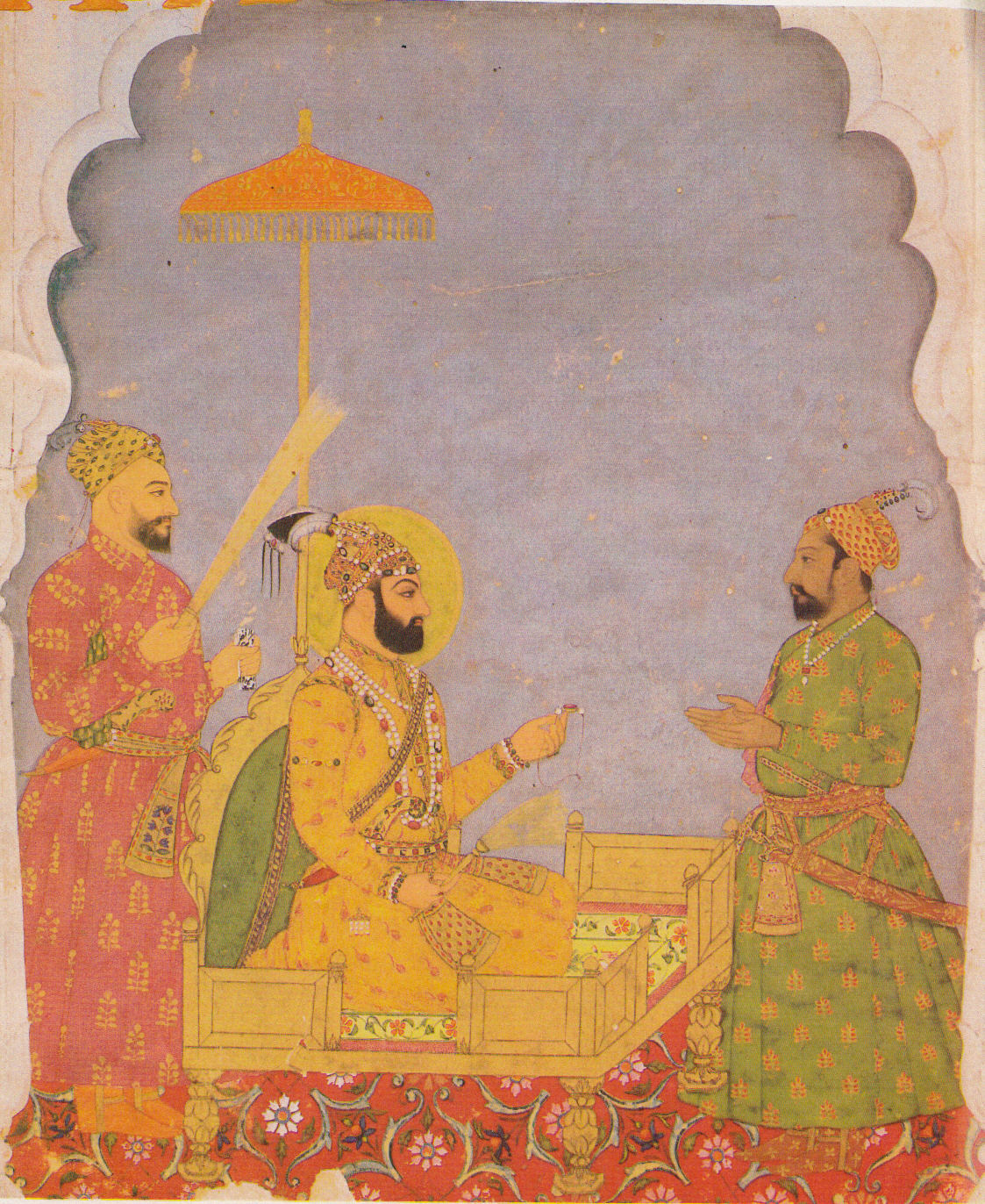
Emperor Farrukhsiyar Bestows a Jewel on a Nobleman

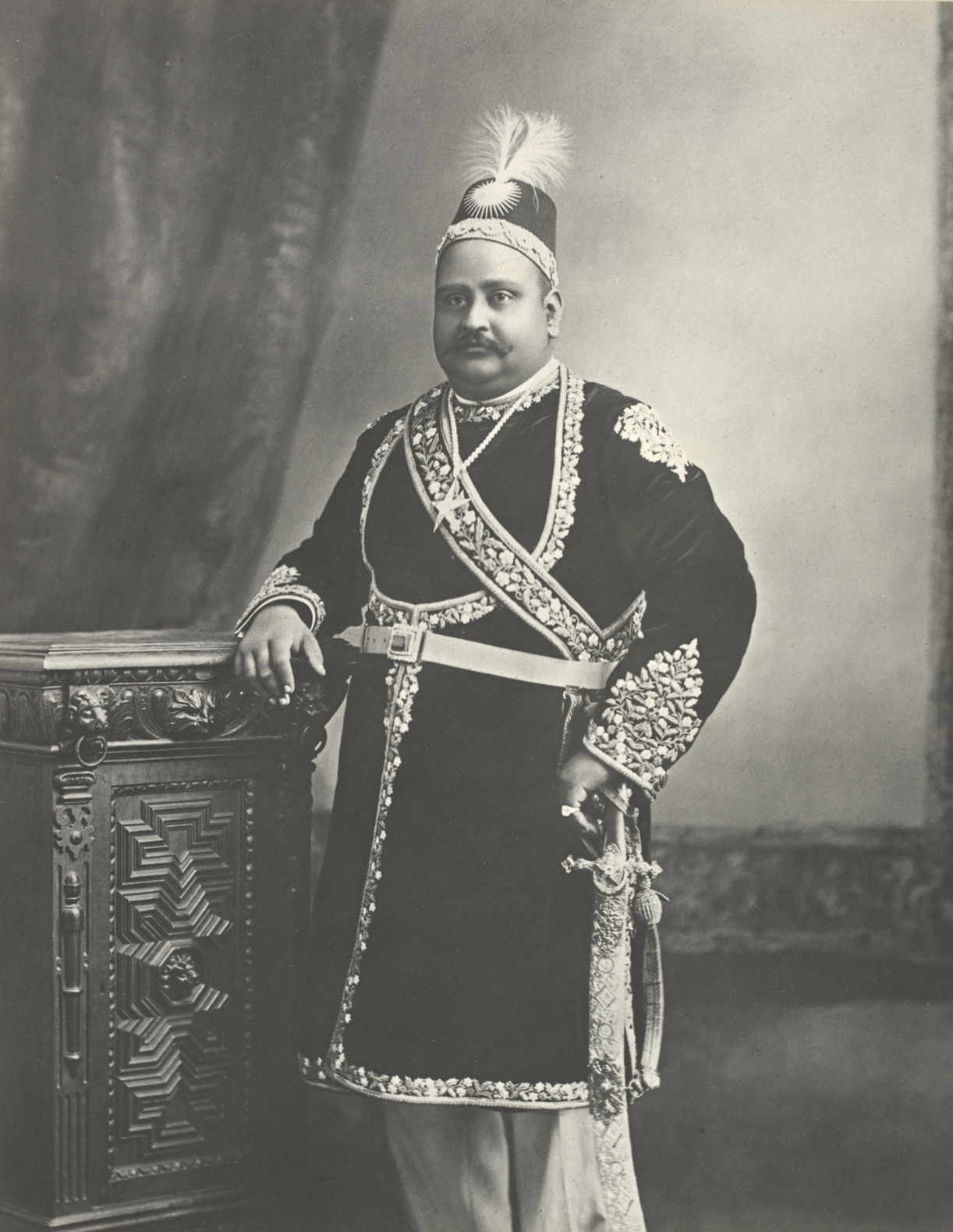
Sir Nawab Khwaja Salimullah was a zamindar with the title of Nawab.

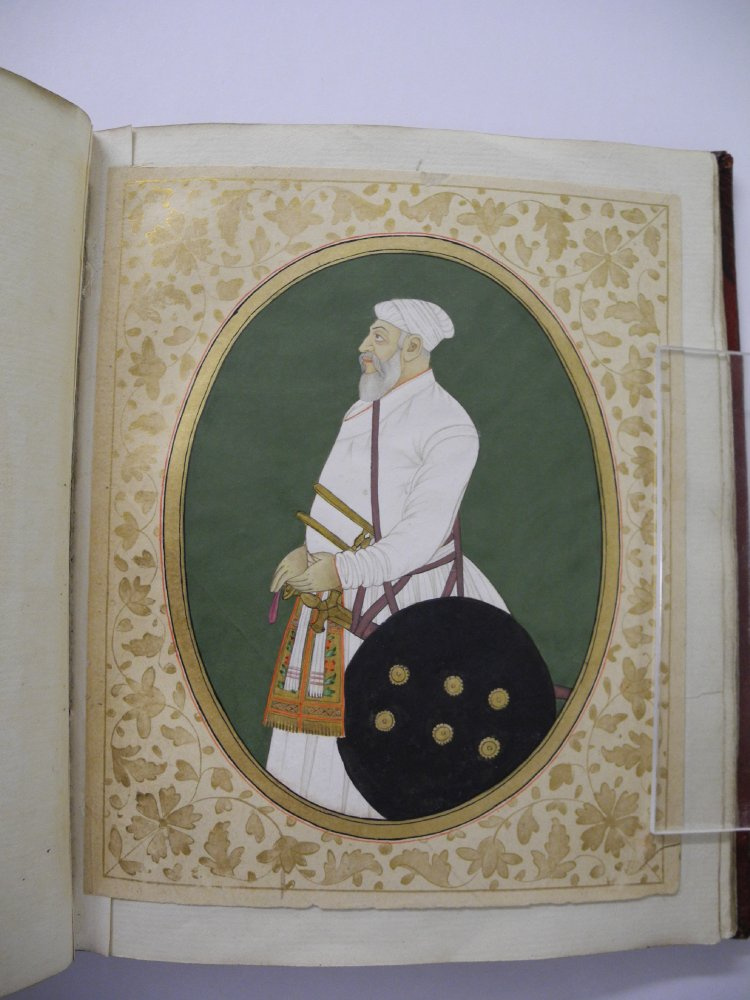
Late 17th century portrait of Fírúz Jang Khán, ruler of Bijapur

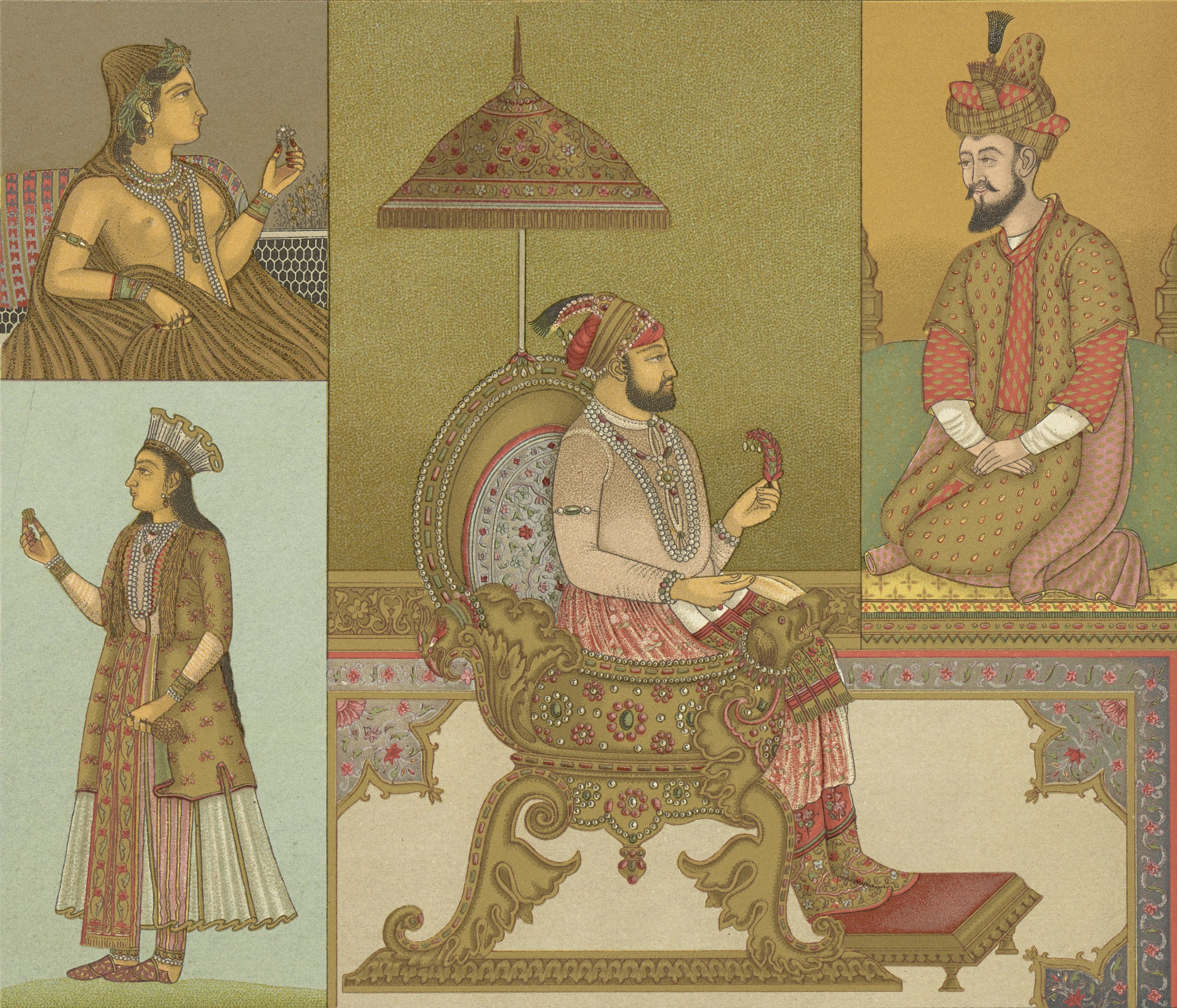
Late 19th century "Costume of India - Moguls" picture depicting Mogul woman (upper left), Mogul Emperor Farrukhsiyar (center) died 1719, and Emperor Humayun (upper right), died in 1556

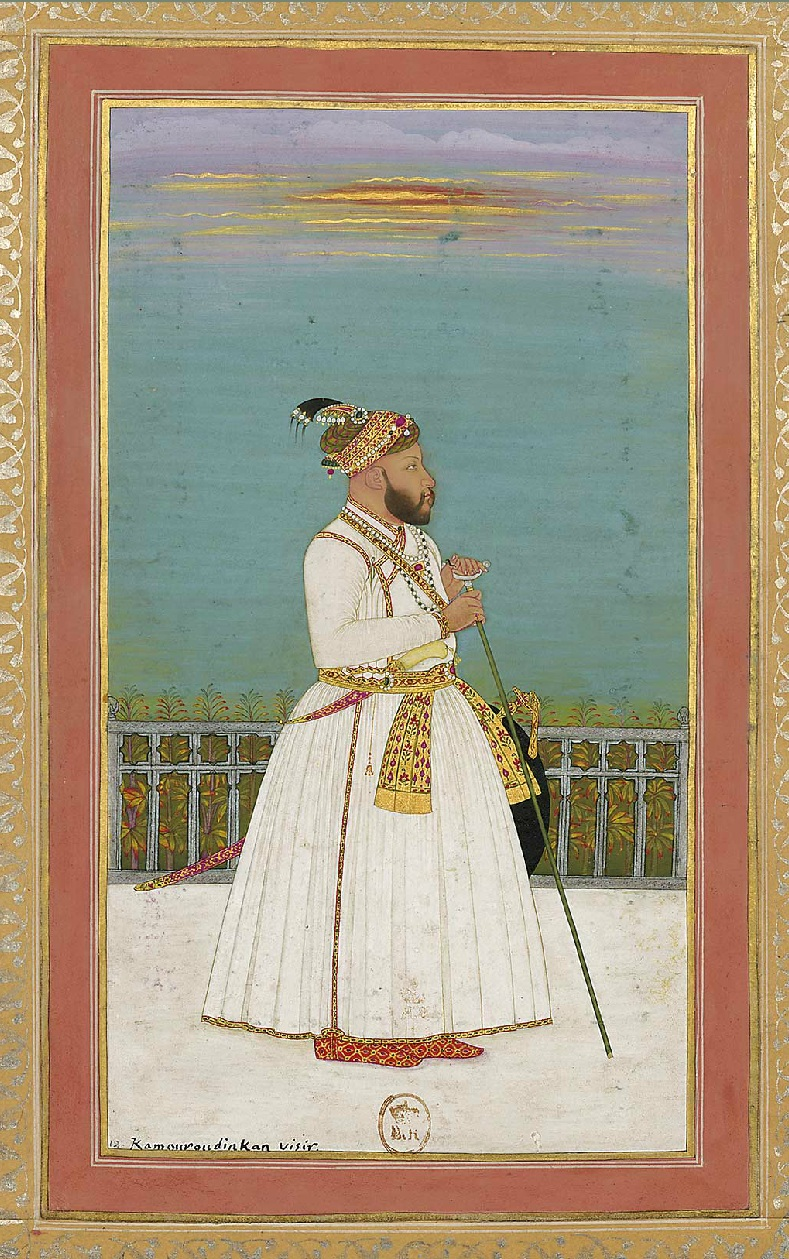
Vizier Qamar ud-Din circa 1735

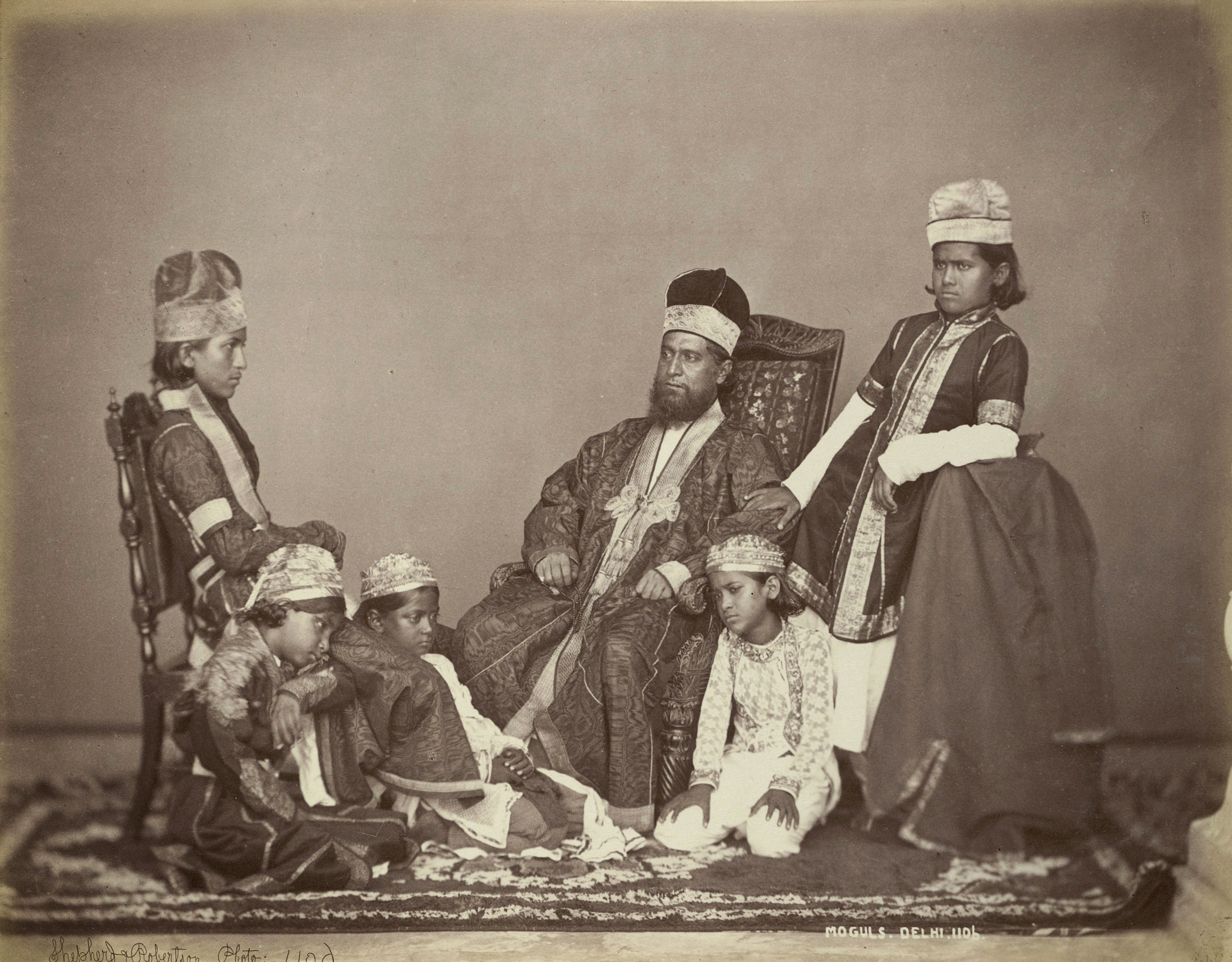
Portrait of "Mogul" father with his children in Delhi (Shepherd & Robertson) circa 1863

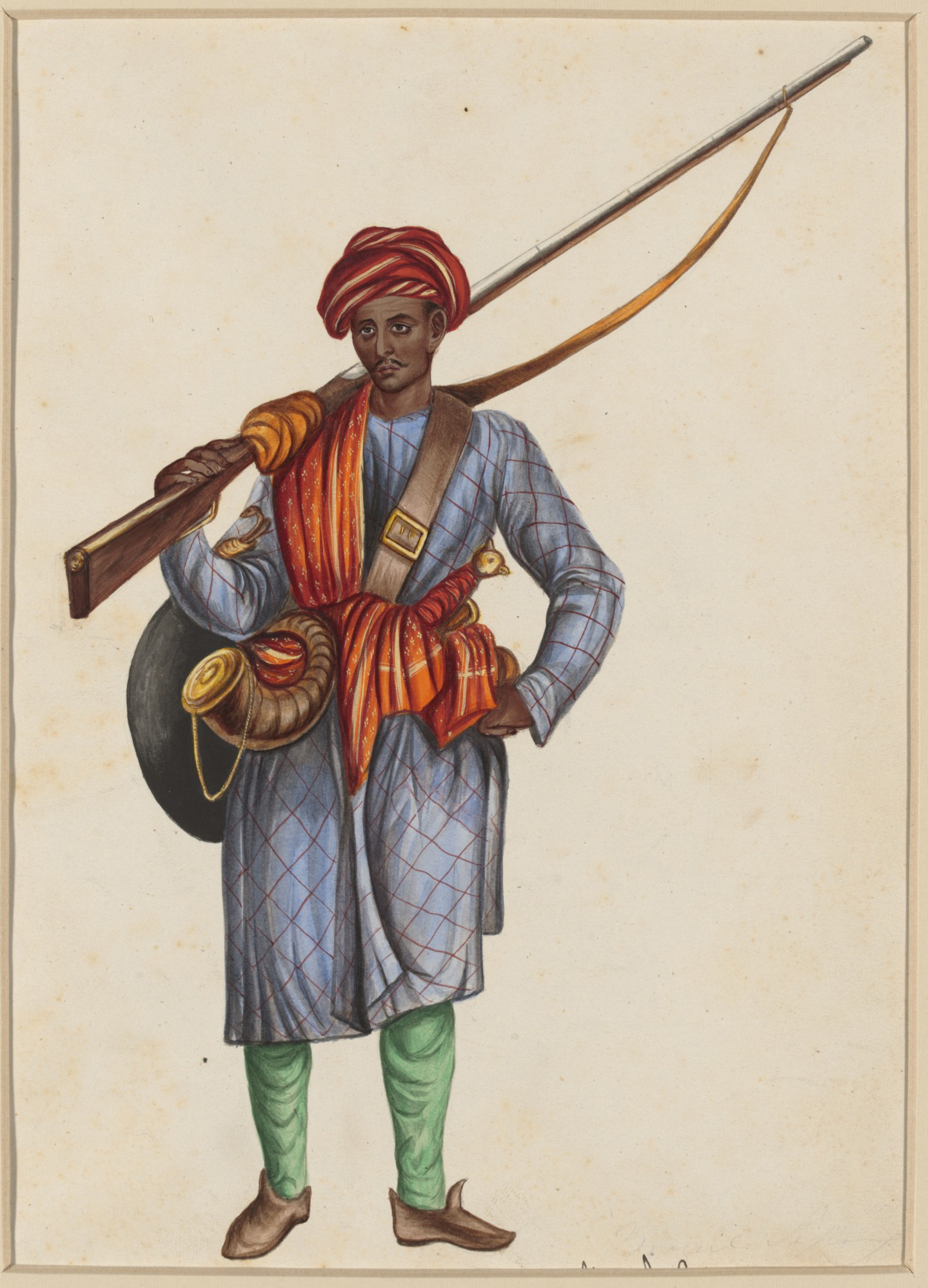
Mughal soldier, 19th century.

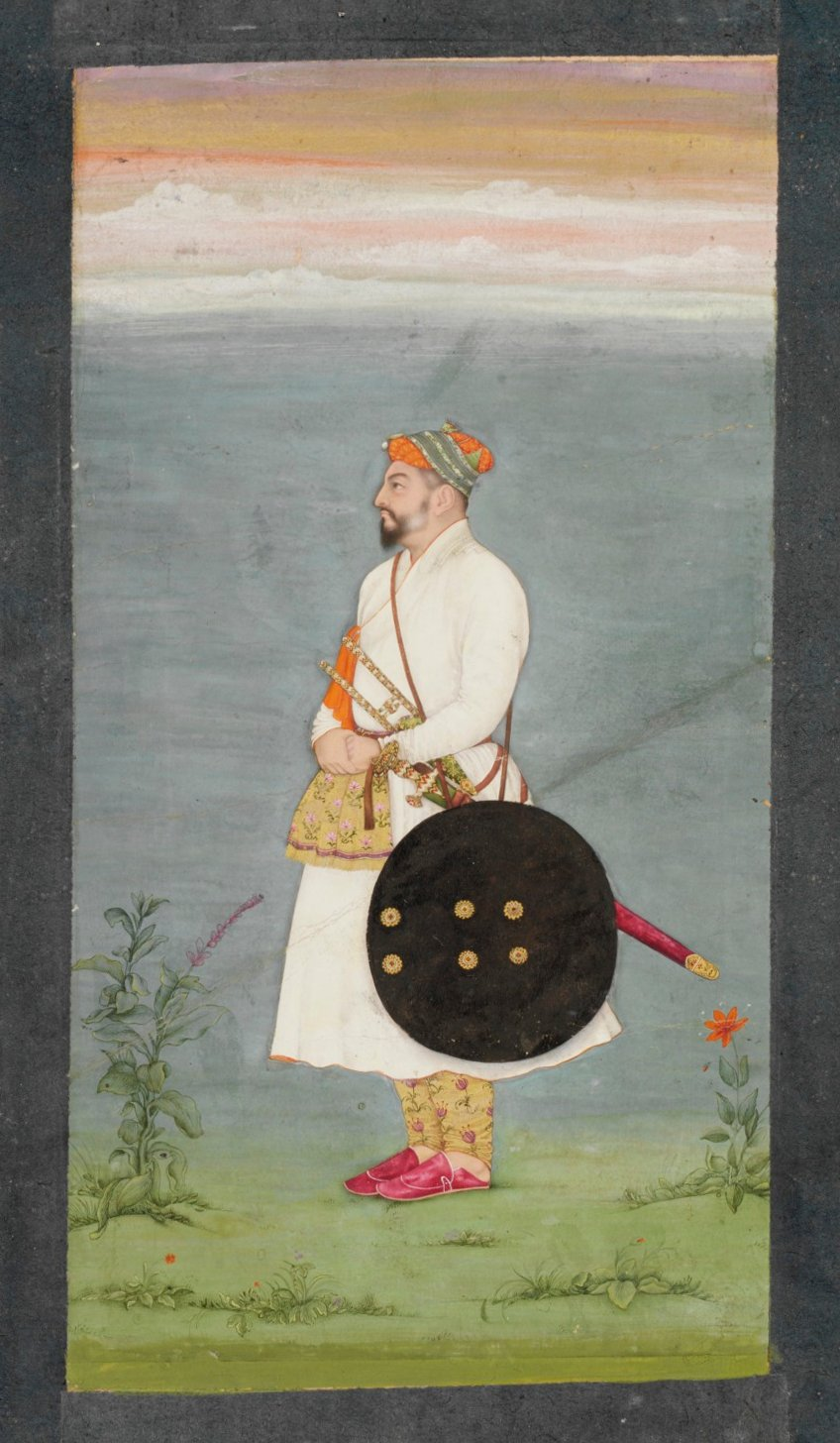
Mughal officer, 17th century.

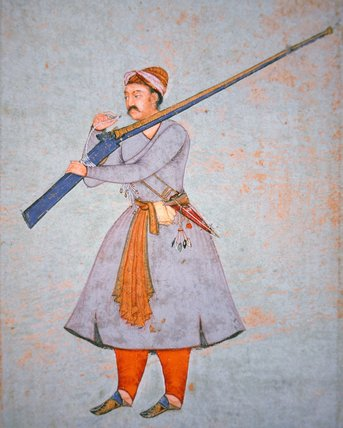
Officer of the Mughal Army with large Matchlock

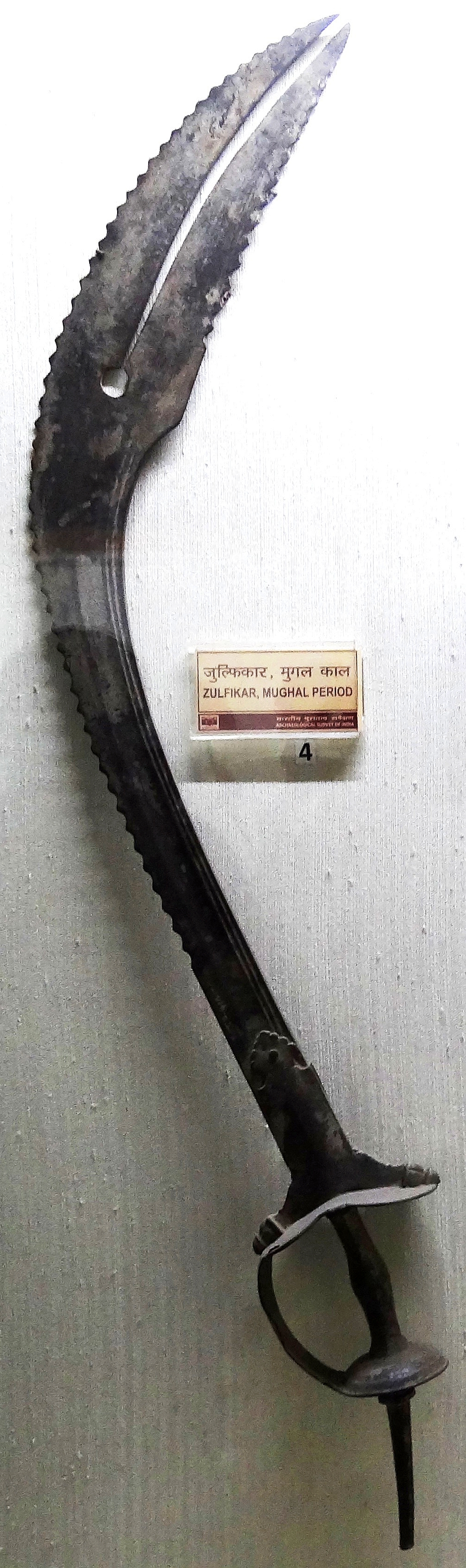
Zulfikar, a Mughal sword

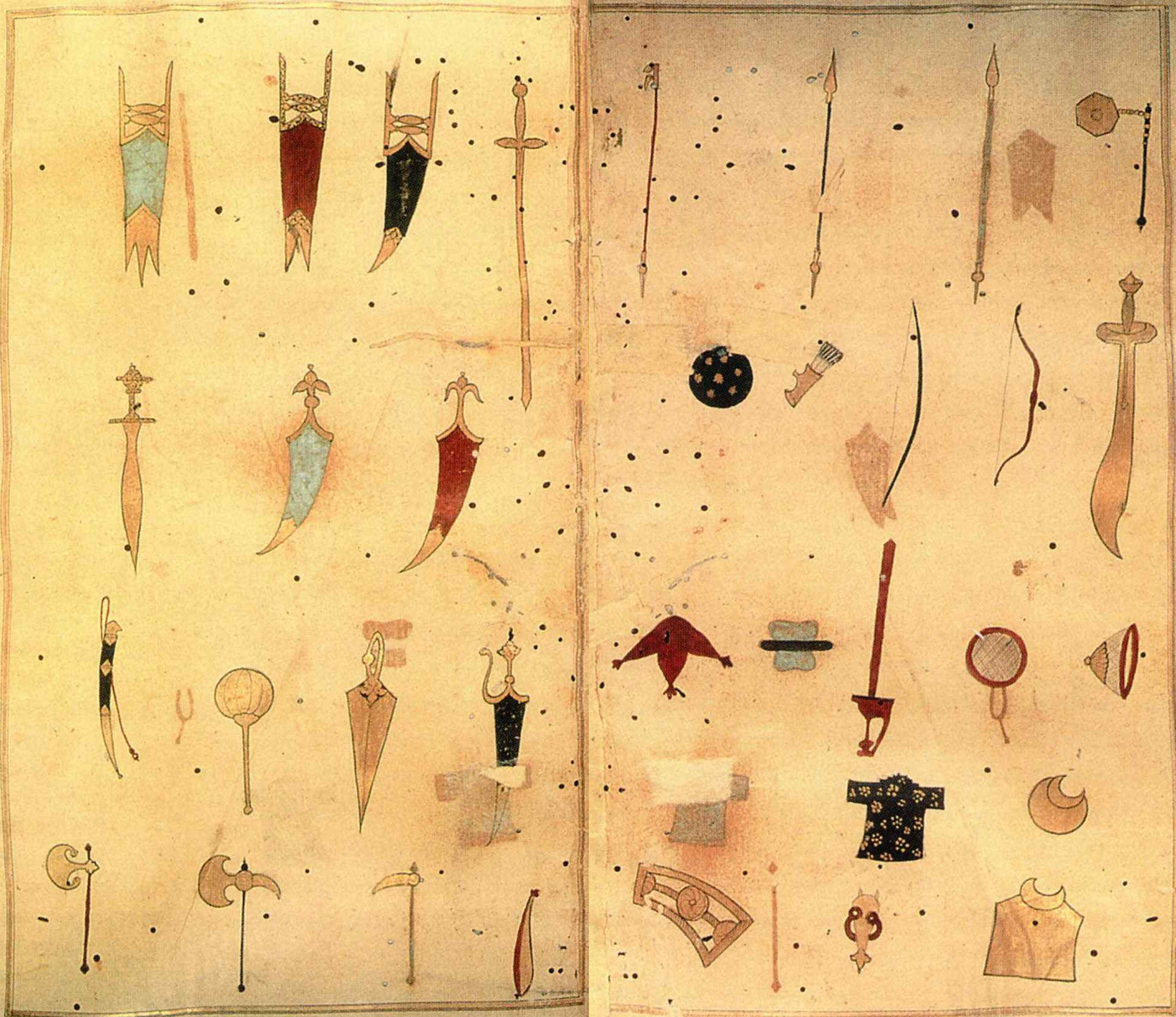
Ain-i Akbari weaponry

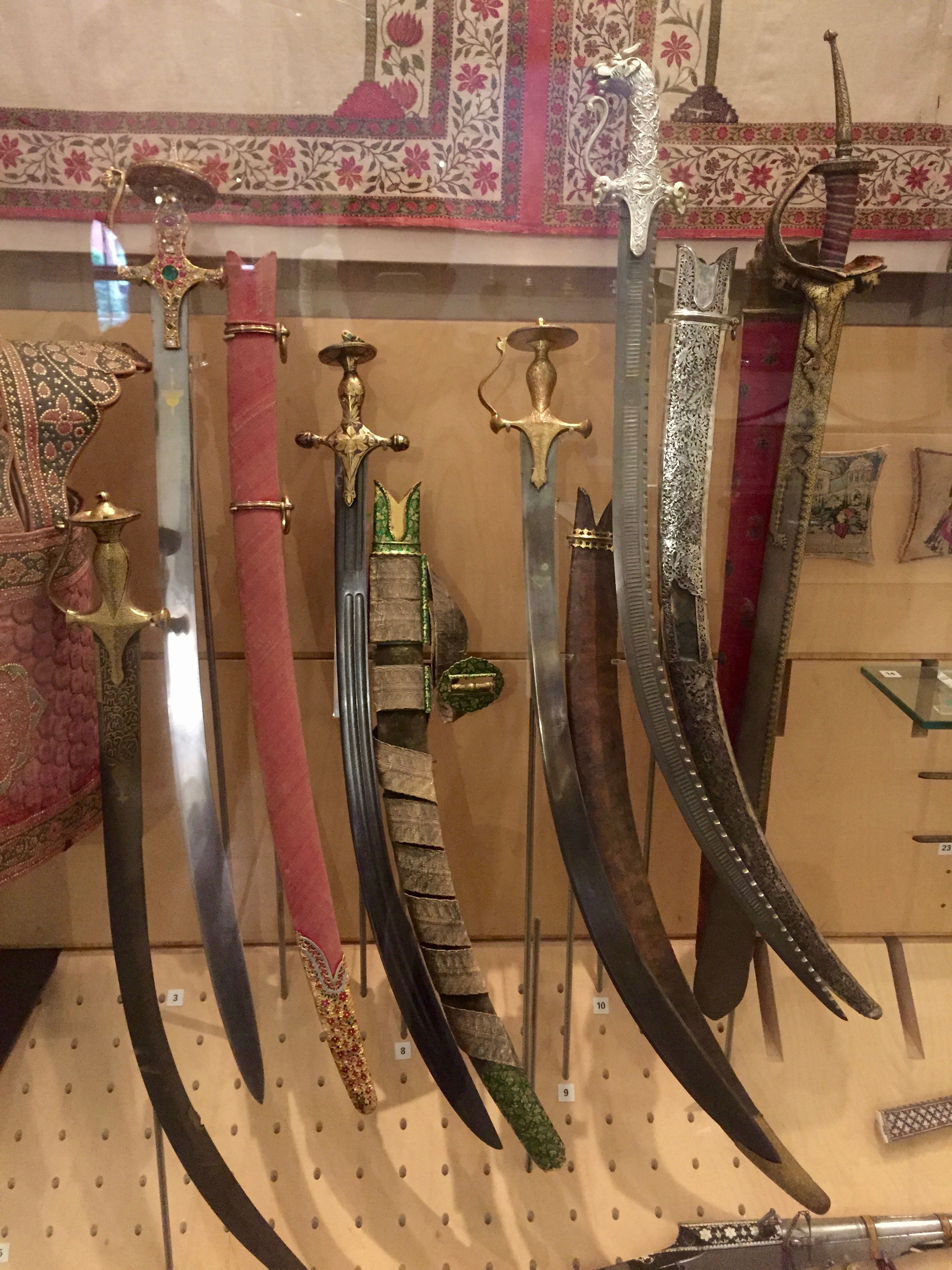
Prince Dara Shikuh's sword and scabbard (number 8), at the V&A Museum in London.

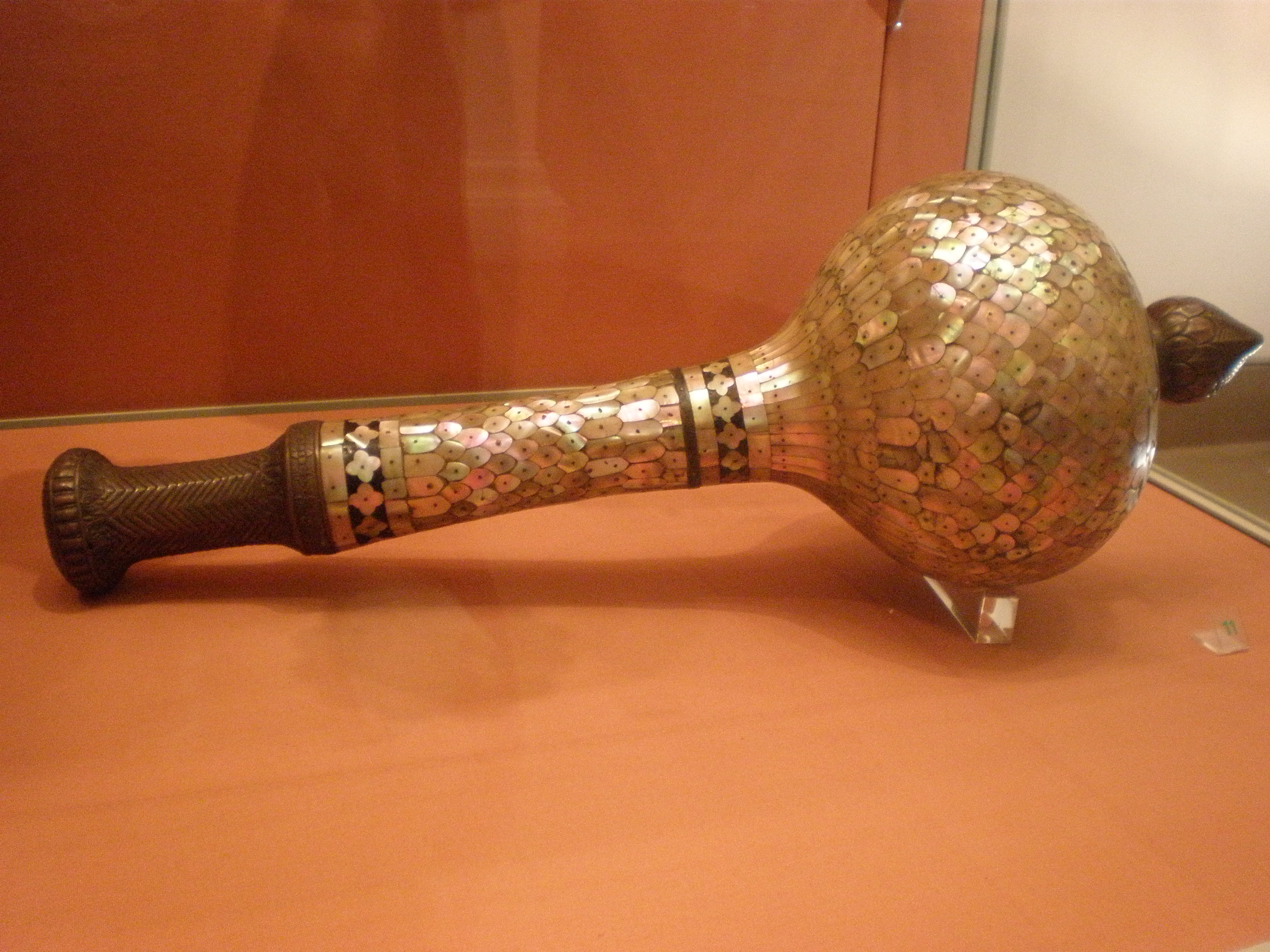
Ceremonial Mace chob

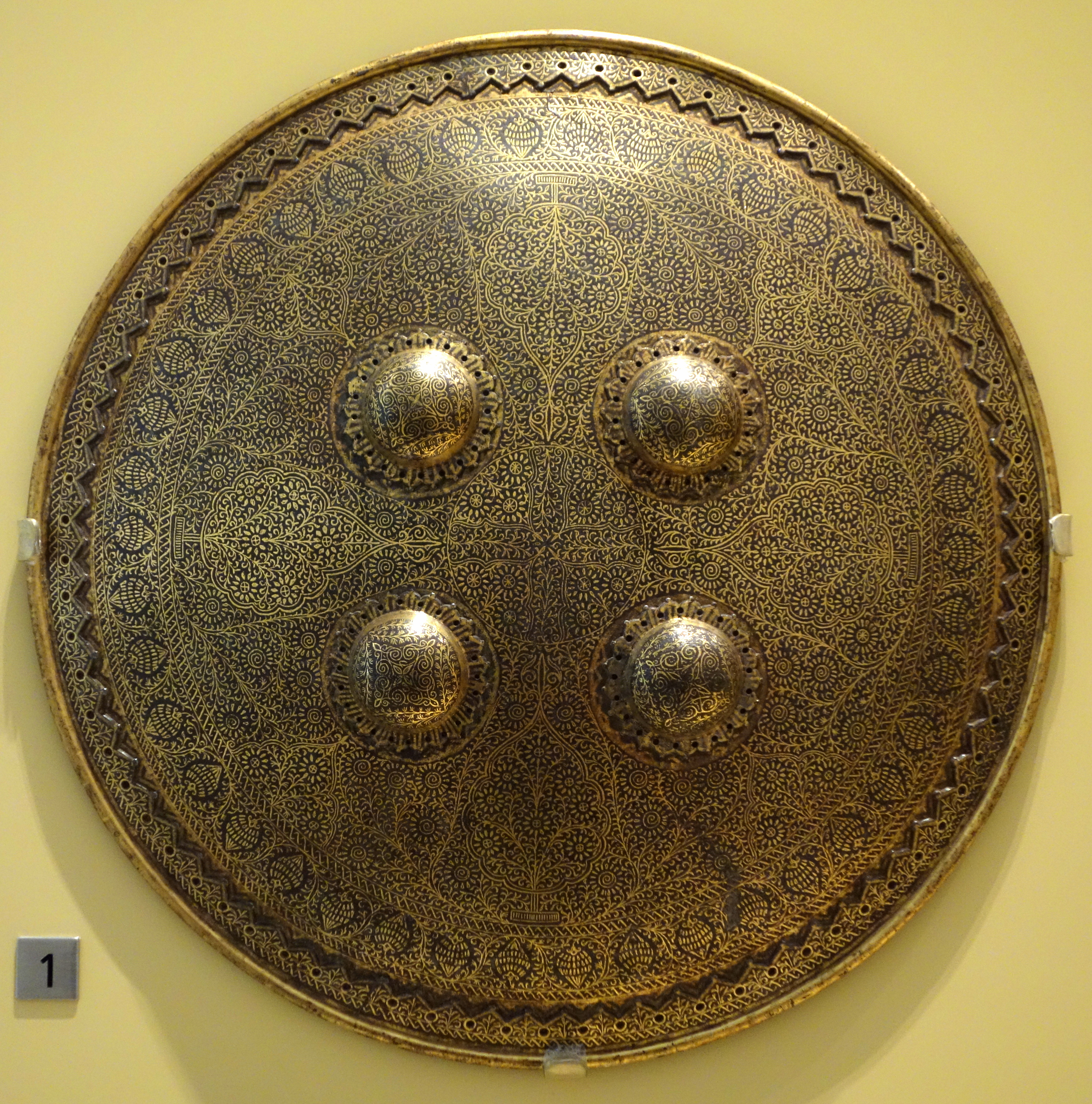
Dhal (shield), North India, Mughal period, 17th century, steel, gold, silk, leather - Royal Ontario Museum - DSC04543

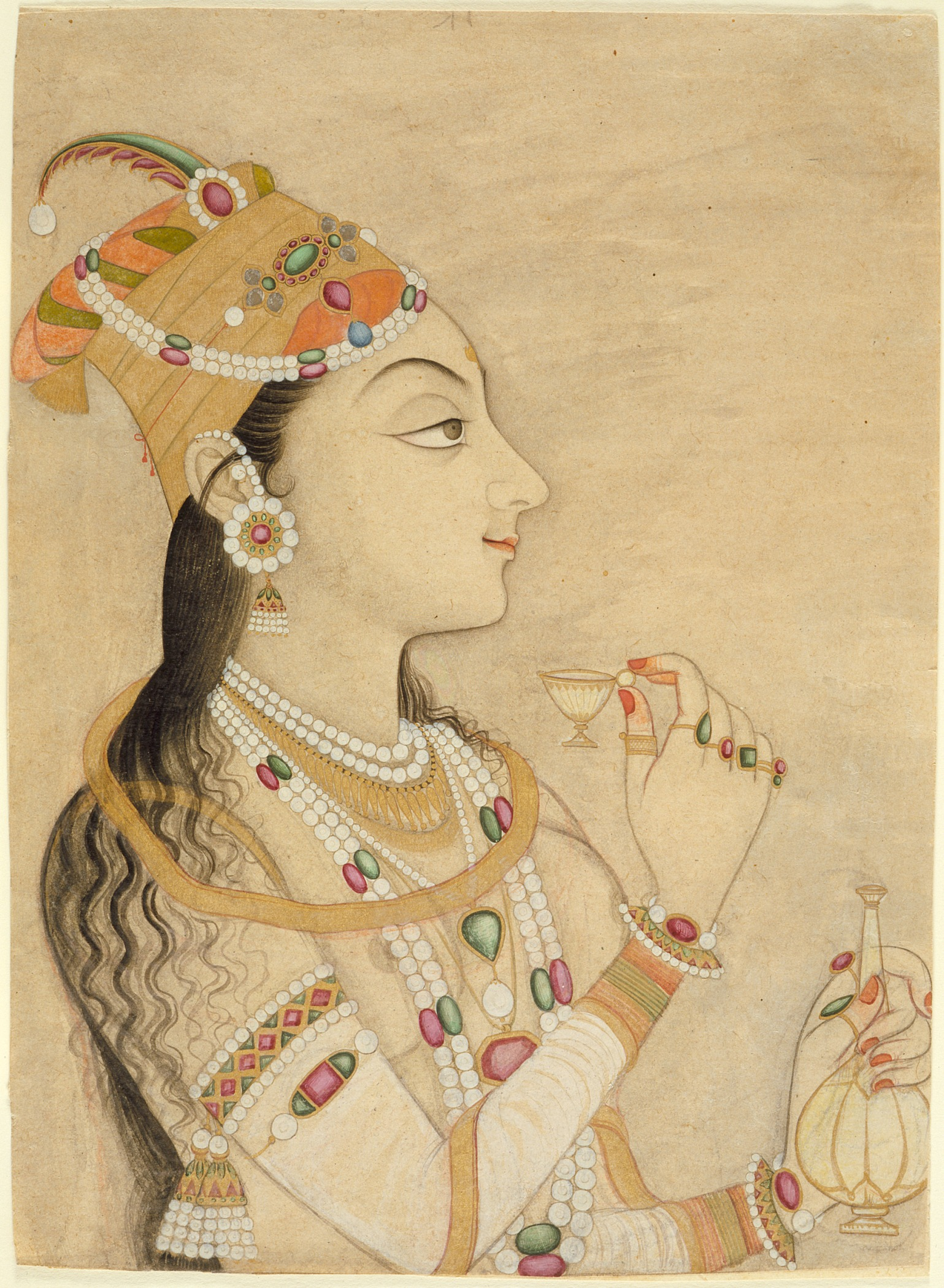
Idealized Portrait of the Mughal Empress Nur Jahan (1577–1645)? LACMA M.81.271.7

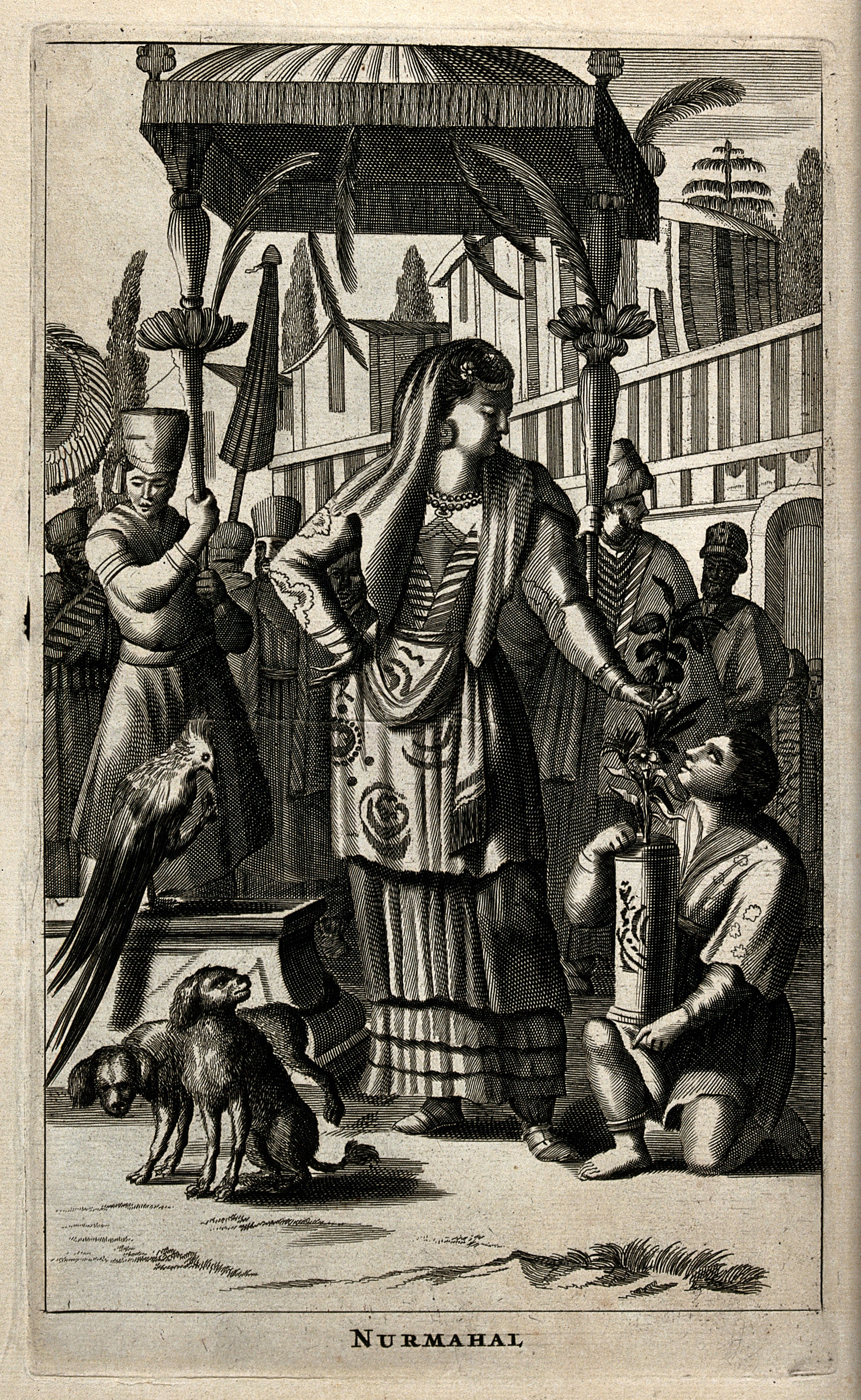
Nur Jahan with her servants

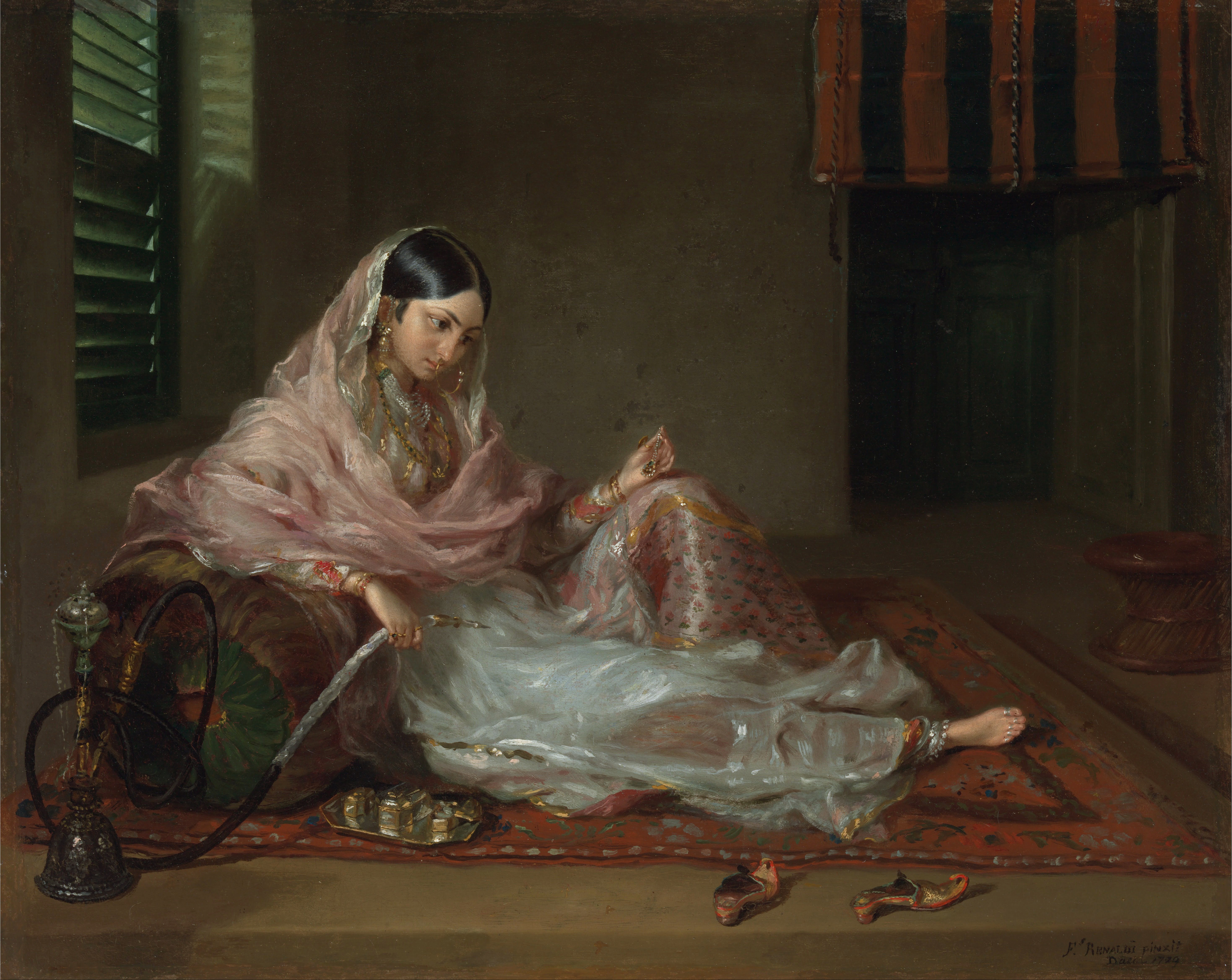
A woman in fine Bengali muslin

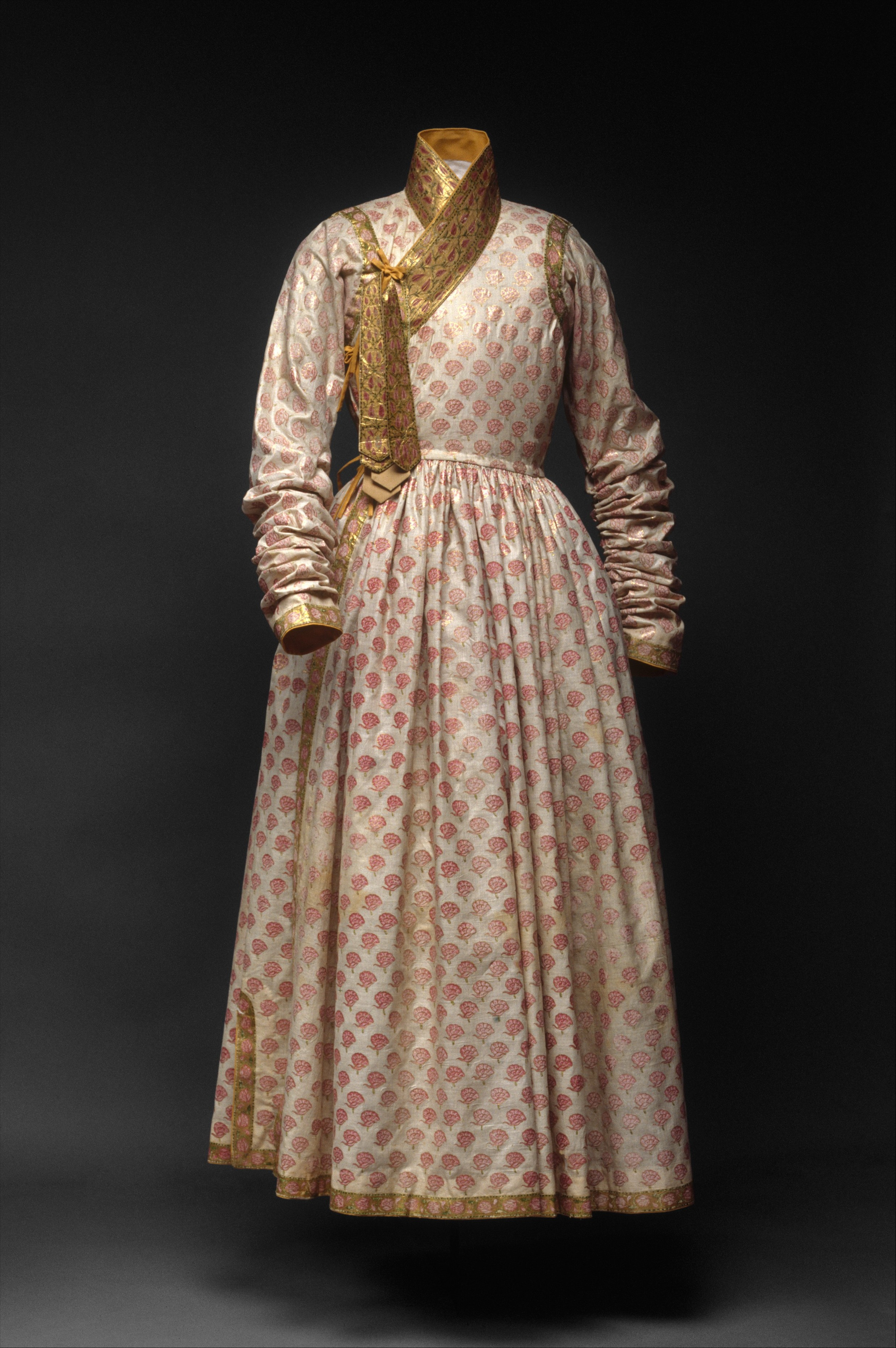
Jama coat worn during Mughal period, 17th century, The Metropolitan Museum of Art

== See also ==
- Delhi Sultanate was an Islamic empire based in Delhi that stretched over large parts of the Indian subcontinent for 320 years (1206–1526).
- Akbar was the third Mughal emperor, who reigned from 1556 to 1605.
- Abu'l-Fazl ibn Mubarak was the grand vizier of the Mughal emperor Akbar, and author of the Akbarnama, the official history of Akbar's reign in three volumes, (the third volume is known as the Ain-i-Akbari) and a Persian translation of the Bible.
- Fathullah Shirazi was a Persian-Indian polymath—a scholar, Islamic jurist, finance minister, mechanical engineer, inventor, mathematician, astronomer, physician, philosopher and artist—who worked for Akbar, ruler of the Mughal Empire.
- Ain-i-Akbari a 16th-century detailed document recording the administration of the Mughal Empire under Emperor Akbar, written by his court historian, Abu'l Fazl in the Persian language.
- Mughal clothing refers to clothing developed by the Mughals in the 16th, 17th and 18th centuries throughout the extent of their empire in the Indian subcontinent.
- Mughal Empire was an early-modern empire in South Asia.
- Noble Nobility is a social class normally ranked immediately below royalty and found in some societies that have a formal aristocracy.
- Zamindar in the Indian subcontinent was an autonomous or semiautonomous ruler of a state who accepted the suzerainty of the Emperor of Hindustan.
- Mansabdar was a military unit within the administrative system of the Mughal Empire introduced by Akbar.
- Mughal weapons significantly evolved during the ruling periods of Babur, Akbar, Aurangzeb and Tipu Sultan.
- Mughal artillery included a variety of cannons, rockets, and mines employed by the Mughal Empire.
- Muslin a wide range of superfine, delicate and sheer fabrics.
- Bafta cloth a kind of calico, produced in Bharuch formerly known as Broach.
- Girdler's carpet
