= Adhotar =

Coarse handloom cotton variety from India

Adhotar was a coarse variety handloom cloth with a loosely woven structure. Adhotar was a cloth of locals in the early 19th century. It was one among various other Indian handloom fabrics such as khaddar, garha, dres, and khasa.

The cloth was also meant for printing to produce coarser chintz called dogha or galef.

== See also ==
- Bafta cloth
- Calico
- Chintz
- Dosuti
- Khadi
- Longcloth
