= Dorea (cloth) =

Striped cloth from India

Dorea (Doriyā, Doreas, Dooreas, Doriyah) was a type of striped or check patterned cloth made in the Indian subcontinent. The continued (warp side) striped Dorea was a simplest form of Dorea.

Doriya was a kind of cloth, originally made of cotton, but later made of silk, or tussar or silk and cotton both. It has a flimsy texture when compared to Ilayecha. Doriya was also called "a striped cloth", with stripes running along with the warp of the cloth.

"Are-doriya" was a type with diagonal stripes, while "Salaidar" was a cloth in which the stripes were across the width or in the weft.

== Mention ==
"Ain-i-Akbari" is a document from the Mughal empire. Doriya's name is mentioned there, along with contemporary cotton fabrics such as Khasa, Salu, Bafta, Tansukh, Dupatta, and Panchtoliya.

== Fabric ==
Originally it was made of cotton only, the cloth was later manufactured with silk and other type of materials as well.

the warp consists of three parts of cotton and two parts of Tasar or different colors. The woof is all cotton of one color, so that the cloth is striped lengthways, and is dyed entirely by the weavers in the thread

— Francis Buchanan-Hamilton

== Exports ==
Bengal exported a variety of fabrics ranging in fineness from ''Dorea to Sologazi, Chela, Sanu, Rumal, Fota, Chintz, Guinea cloth, Garra, and Sailcloth.''

== See also ==
- Bafta cloth
