= Salu (cloth) =

One of seven cotton cloths explicitly mentioned in Ain-i-Akbari

Salu (variously transcribed in English as sālū, saloo, and archaically, shallee, shalloo, shella, and sallo) (Note: Some early English-language variants possibly arose from confusion with shalloon.) is a type of twill cloth, woven from cotton and dyed red, originally made in India. Prior to the introduction of modern industrial techniques, it was produced exclusively hand spun (khaddar) yarns with locally available dyes. Salu is one of seven cotton cloths explicitly mentioned in the 16th century Mughal record Ain-i-Akbari, together with khasa, tansukh, doriya, bafta, dupatta, and panchtoliya.

== History & description ==
Salu appears to be an ancient fabric; trade references to the Persian market from Hindustan in the 14th century are documented in the Divan-i-Albisa by Mawlānā Mahmud Nizan Qari. (Note: Divan-i-Albisa cited as Diwan-i-Albisa by Nizan al Din Mahmoud Kari in Encyclopaedia of Untouchables Ancient, Medieval and Modern) According to a 16th-century Mughal Empire record (Ain-i -Akbari), Salu cost two mohur per piece at that time.

The original salu was made in India from materials sourced entirely in India, but a dyeing process introduced by refugees from the French Revolution using English-made cloth called mārkīn ("American") later became common India. Accordingly, salu has also been described as a red-colored mārkīn cloth by certain sources.

Salu is distinguished by its red color, which is achieved through the use of Indian madder (rubia cordiofolia) in a red shade. Turkey red is one of the alizarin colours that can be extracted from Indian madder. Baden Henry Powell mentioned salu as a madder-dyed cloth in his book Hand-book of the economic products of the Punjab, with a combined index and glossary of technical vernacular words.

=== Variations ===
- Kharua was another red cloth that was coarser in texture than salu.
- Mahyu-salu was a type from Mau, Uttar Pradesh.

== Use ==
Salu is used as a foundation cloth for embroidery alongside variants such as markin, which is slightly coarser than salu. Salu is also used in kantha, which is an embroidery craft in Indian subcontinent. Embroidered with silk threads, it is a popular type in Punjabi weddings. The famous red salu was used for ladies' dresses, borders of ladies coats, turbans, and curtains. It is also known as Saloo in Punjab and is also used as a veil or wrapper.

=== Other cultures ===
- Nupe ladies were also noted for their use of salu, a red cloth.
- Salu was given to Dogra ladies in dowry.

== See also ==
- Phulkari
- Turkey red
- Nillaes
