= Gazzi cloth =

Native handloom cotton variety of Punjab

Gazzi cloth was an old handloom cloth; it was among indigenous coarse cotton varieties from Punjab.

== Texture ==
Gazzi was categorized as coarse cotton cloth similar to ghatti, garha, sussi, and dosuti, but it was thinner than eksuti and dosuti but inferior than garha.

== Production and use ==
The Punjab region was famous for the production of many coarse cotton textiles produced with local short staple cotton. The Gazzi manufacturing was noted in many Punjab towns such as Jallandhar, Ambala, Kangra, Hoshiarpur, Delhi, Gujranwala, Lahore, etc. It was suitable material for the clothes of poor to common people.

== Export ==
Gazzi was among export cloths exported from the Punjab region. Remarkable quantities were exported to Afghanistan in the 19th century.

== See also ==
- Dosuti
- Gatti
