= Alexander Drew =

Alexander Drew may refer to:

- Alexander Drew, character in True Blood
- Alexander Drew (tennis), competed in 1924 Wimbledon Championships – Men's Singles
- Alexander Drew (company), taken over by Coloroll
