= BAFTA (disambiguation) =

BAFTA is the British Academy of Film and Television Arts, an independent trade association and charity.

- BAFTA Film Awards, the film awards ceremony by BAFTA
- BAFTA TV Awards, the TV awards ceremony by BAFTA
- BAFTA Children's Awards, the children's awards ceremony by BAFTA
- BAFTA Games Awards, the games awards ceremony by BAFTA
- BAFTA Cymru, the Welsh branch of BAFTA
- BAFTA Scotland, the Scottish branch of BAFTA

BAFTA or bafta may also refer to:

- Baltic Free Trade Area, a 1994–2004 free trade agreement between Estonia, Latvia and Lithuania
- Bafta cloth, a plain weave textile originally made in India
