= Kerikam =

Malay traditional clothing

Kerikam (Jawi: کريکم) is a coarse metal thread made of gold or silver used for embroidering. The term kerikam either comes from the French word clinquant, and "kam" (Cambodian for "type of fabric") or "kham" (Thai for gold). It is an important material in the Malay art of embroidery, traditionally used by the Malays in Brunei, Indonesia, Malaysia and southern Thailand. Kerikam embroidery can be found on baju kurung, kebaya and tudung.

== History ==
This art of using kerikam for embroidery originated from the court of Malaca sultanate, in the early 15th century. With the fall of the Malaca sultanate, the art spreads all over the Malay archipelago. It is known as kelingkan and kelengkan in Selangor, keringkam in Sarawak, teringkam or terekam in Terengganu, kelingkam and kelengkang in Kelantan. In Riau islands, it is known as Manto, in Palembang as mudawarah and in South Africa as mediora. All of these names carry the same meaning.

The use of kerikam was even mentioned in the Sejarah Melayu (Malay Annals) and Ranee Margaret Brooke's My Life in Sarawak: The Ranee of Sarawak.

Kerikam was brought to the Malay archipelago by South Indian traders. It is therefore possibly derived from mukaish embroidery, and part of the family that includes the techniques badla and tulle bi telli. Much like kerikam, tulle bi telli is a counted thread embroidery worked with flat metal threads that need to be controlled by flat, two holed needles. Telli embroidery was done on gauze (as well as more solid fabrics) before the invention of bobbinet tulle. Another connection is that the basic embroidery of kerikam, often completed as the second step of the process, is called tali air. Telli can also be transliterated from Arabic as "tali", and us known to have definitively been used in Egypt since the 16th century (possibly earlier, though the evidence is not conclusive).

== Tudung Keringkam ==
Keringkam or Selayah is a traditional type of headscarf traditionally worn by women in the Malaysian state of Sarawak. It is handcrafted with fine embroidery work, that complements the traditional Malay clothing of Sarawak. In the old days, Keringkam was only worn by the Malay royalty and nobility. However now, this traditional headscarf is often worn when attending special occasions such as weddings and cultural events. The term tudung keringkam is believed to be originated from kerikam, the name of the thread used for embroidery. This intricate craft of embroidery is also found in other states in Malaysia, such as Kelantan, Terengganu, Perak, and Johor.

== See also ==
- Malaysian cultural outfits
- Culture of Malaysia
