= Tulle bi telli =

Egyptian textile with embedded metal

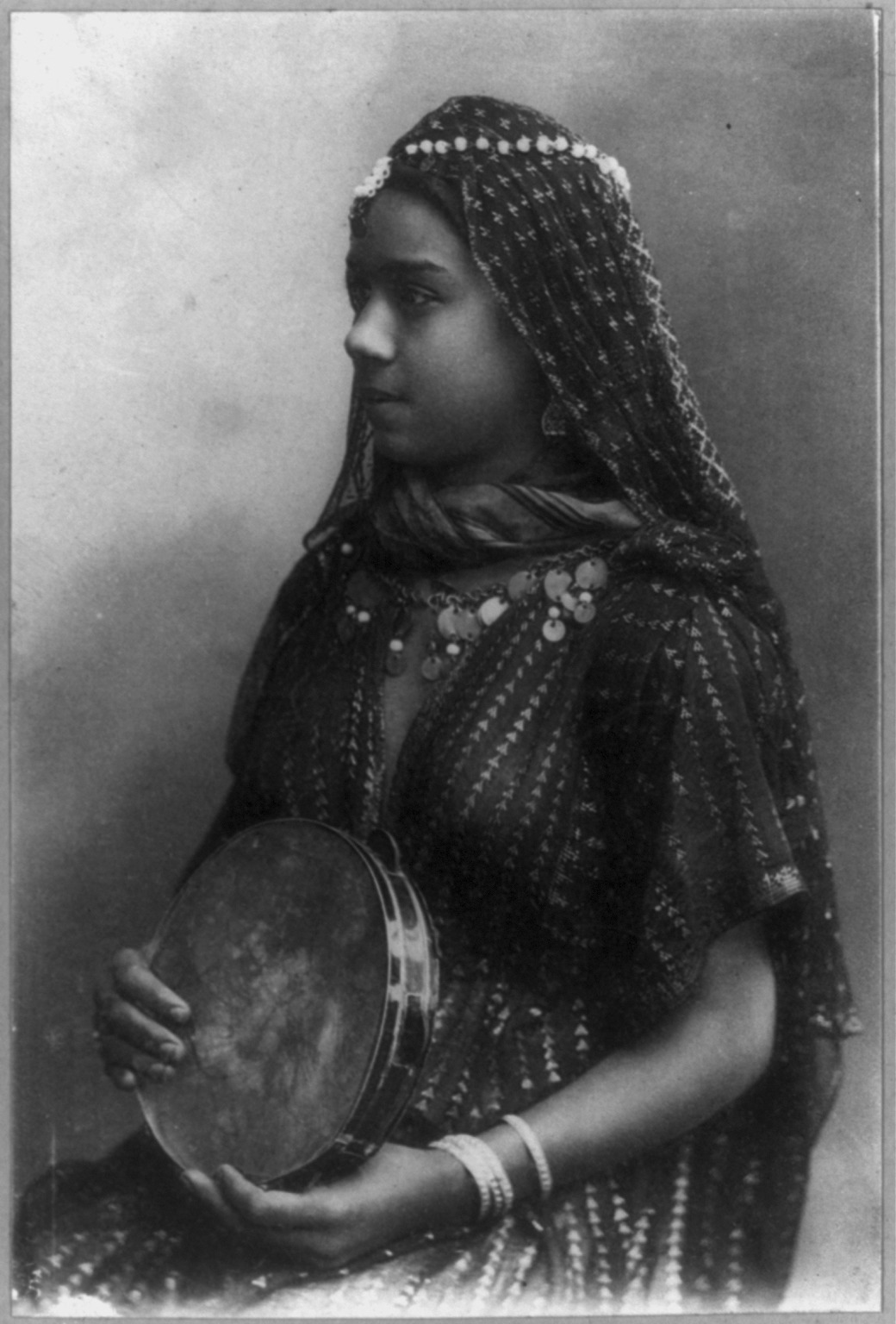
Egyptian girl in tulle-bi-telli

Tulle-bi-telli, also known as Assuit or 'Assiut after Asyut, Egypt, where it is made, is a textile combining cotton or linen mesh with small strips of metal. The first documentation of the fabric is in the 18th century. Other spellings include assuite, asyut, assyut, asyute, and azute. The name translates roughly as "net with metal".

== Properties ==
Assuit has great lateral elasticity, thanks to its openwork mesh. It is heavy, and retains heat, but is favoured for its ability to drape.

== Production ==
The base material is bobbinet, which is a machine-made fabric made of cotton or, in older pieces, linen. The embroidery is applied by hand. Thin strips of alloy are threaded onto a flat, wide needle with a flat, wide eye. Each strip is approximately 1/8" wide and 18" to 24" long. The strips are threaded into the mesh, criss-crossed, flattened with the fingernails, and cut. The fabric is then stamped down, and when the designs are finished, the fabric is passed through a roller to flatten the metal even more.

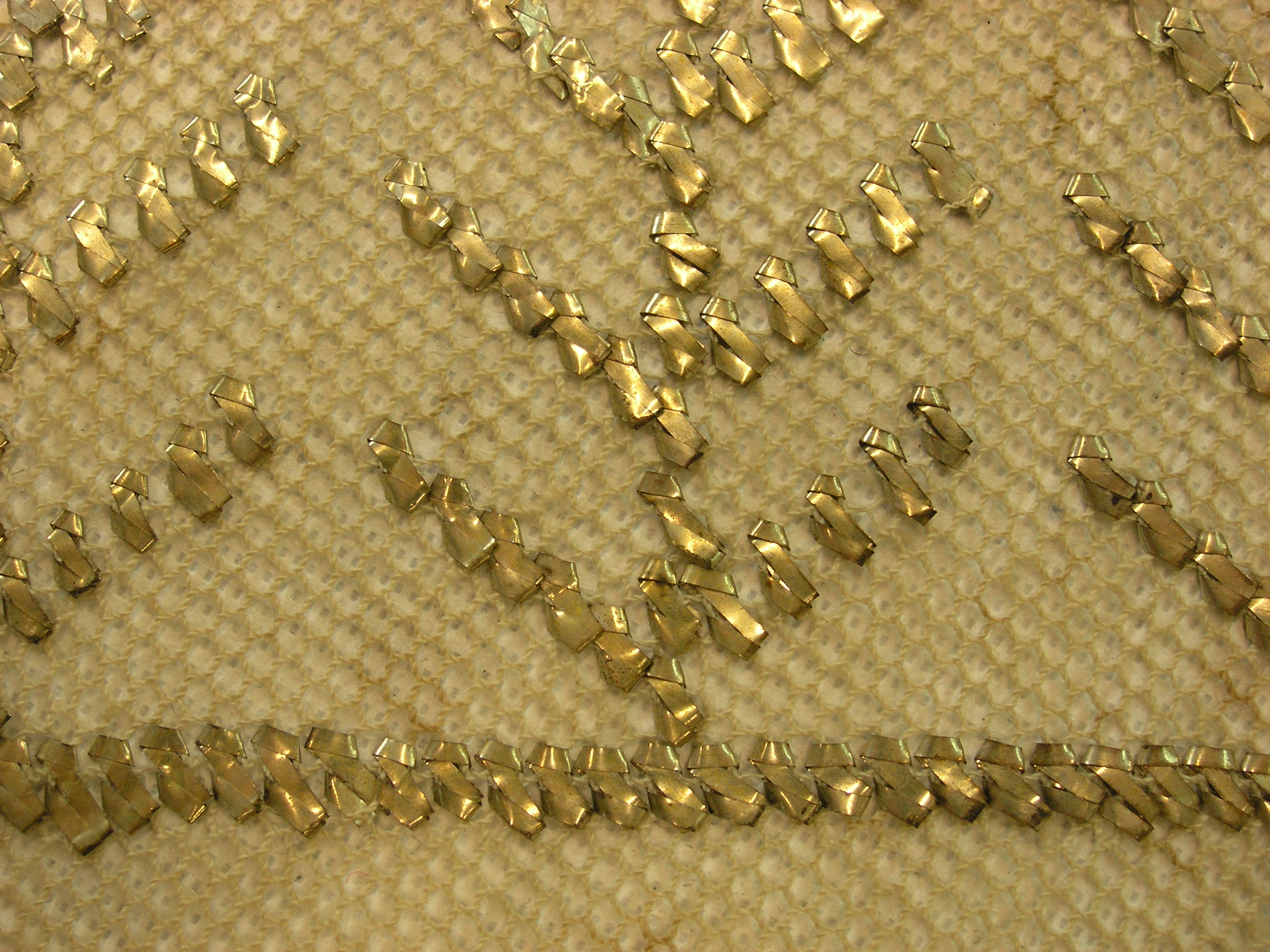
Individual stitches up close

== Motifs ==
Many tulle bi telli pieces have geometric or figural motifs (such as people, animals, and objects). One such motif is the comb, which is included as a visual reference to pre-wedding henna nights. People may represent the bride or the wedding procession. A camel, especially with a person or object on its back, represents the groom. A bed represents the marriage, and often bed motifs are placed next to a row of star motifs, evoking the night and therefore the things a husband and wife do in bed.

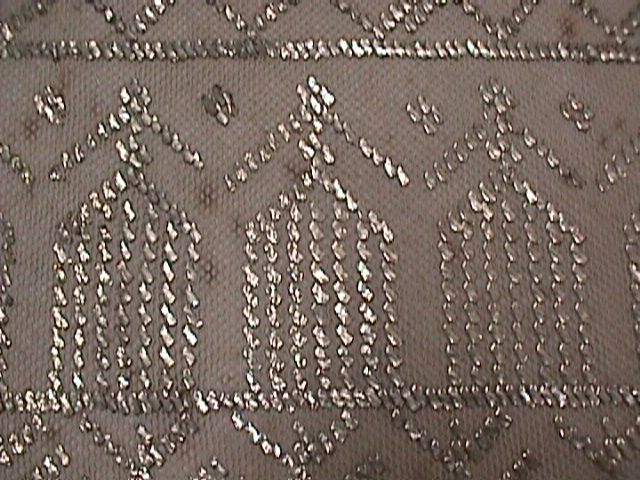
Row of stylized human figures

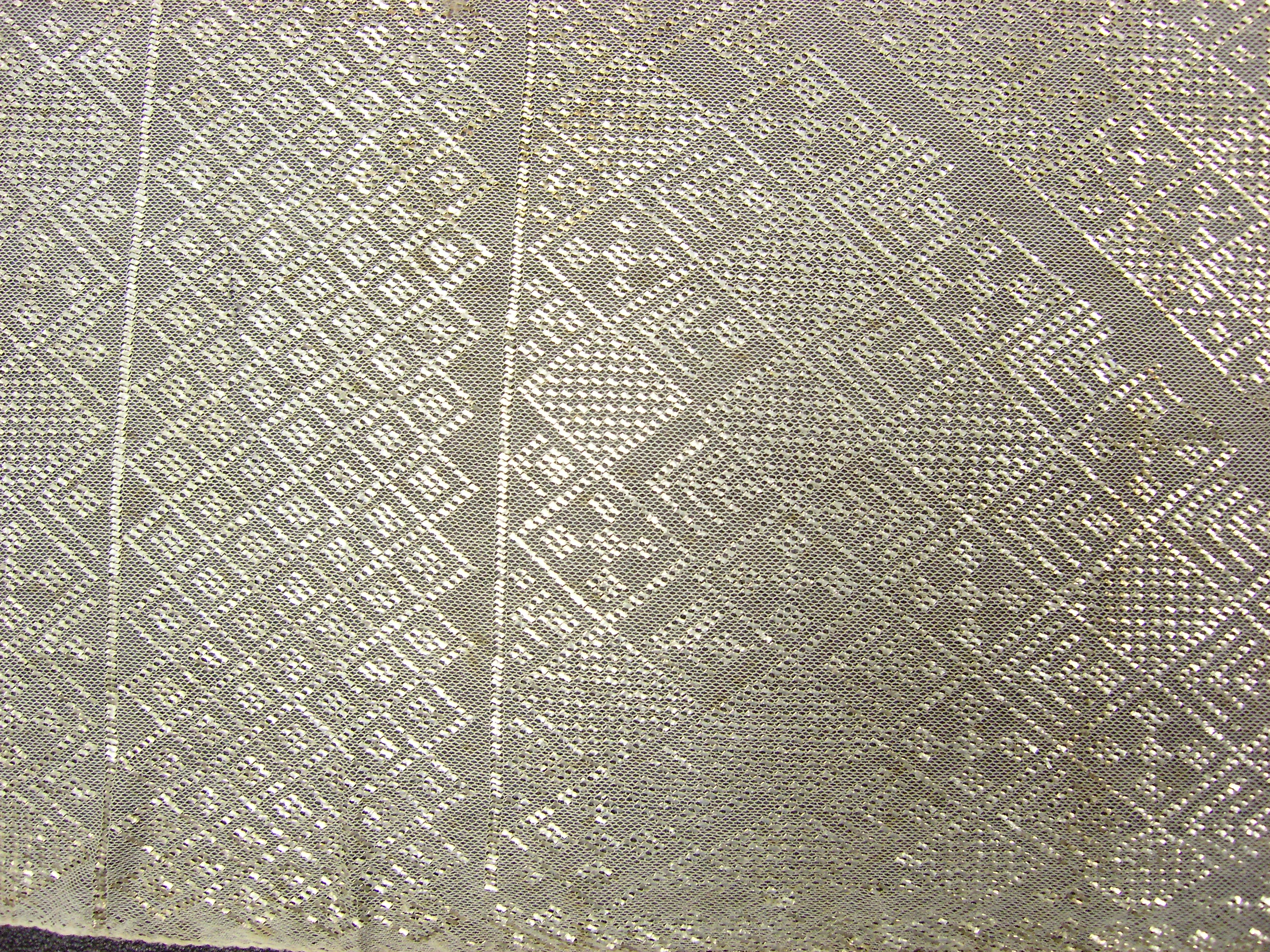
Geometric motifs

== History ==
Tulle-bi-telli possibly has its roots in Turkey, where the similar embroidery style tel kirma originates. The tulle commonly used in the fabric and the machine to make it was associated with France, but invented in England. Telli embroidery is also related to badla (used in the Gulf), khus-duzi (used in Iran), and kerikam, as can be determined by the particular material used (a flat metal strip), and the way it is worked (a two holed needle). It is also used in Tunisia.

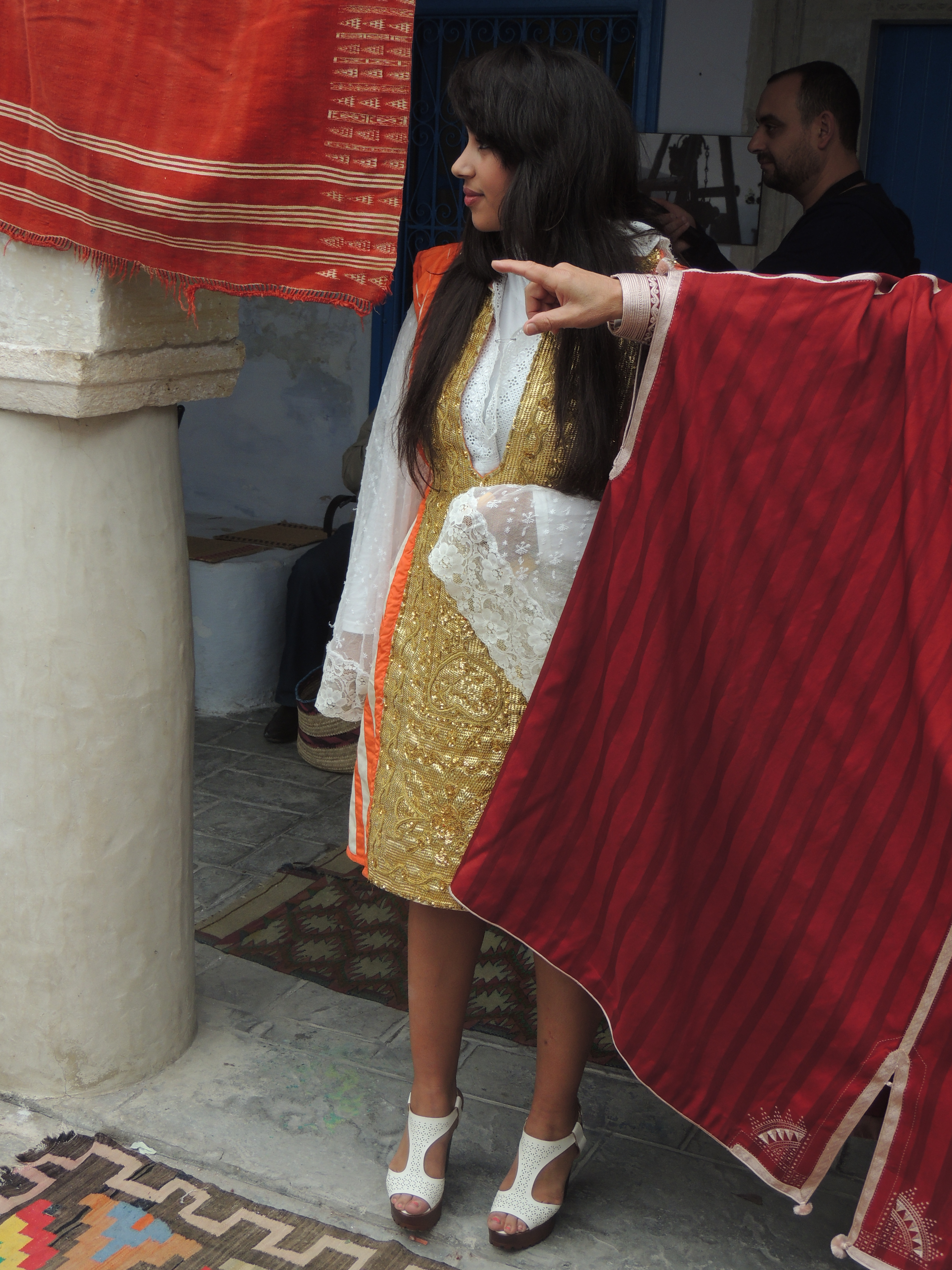
Tunisian dress with extensive telli embroidery.

It is possible the prototype of these embroidery styles originated somewhere in the Turkic cultural sphere and spread outwards thanks to the Ottoman Empire, or that it was invented in India in the Mughal period in the form of Muqayyash embroidery.

The earliest example of something like telli embroidery in Egypt dates to the 16th century, found on textile fragments from Qasr Ibrim. In 1591, Jan Sommer noted that a middle class blacksmith's wife in Egypt wore "dresses embroidered with silver", though it does not mention if this was silver strips, or another material such as sequins, bullion, or silver wrapped around a silk core. Earlier texts potentially date telli embroidery to existing in the Eastern Mediterranean in the 11th century, referring to a "tali" fabric embroidered with gold, but also do not mention whether the metal used was strips. Silver "talli" for making textiles is mentioned in records from 1821, likely referring to the strips. Many traditional dresses made in Egypt for Egyptians, as well as smaller items like sashes made for Libyan traditional garments, were made with a solid black weave fabric that had telli embroidery. By the early 20th century, Assuit became the main center for tulle bi telli production, instead of it being produced throughout the Egyptian Nile Valley.

In Egypt bobbinet machines started being imported from Europe in the 1840s and in the 1870s the first evidence of tulle-bi-telli appeared. Tulle-bi-telli shawls were at first a Coptic specialty. Telli fabric may have been introduced to the West on a large scale during the Columbian Exposition, where a faux Cairo street was set up. The first photo of a Westerner wearing it cannot date later than 1908, and she likely attended the event. Early in tulle-bi-telli's introduction to Europeans, they called it spangled mosquito netting, and it was bought to hang over hats for that very purpose. The Western adoption of telli work was exclusively of tulle bi telli, with deviation from tradition starting early on as garments with white ground fabric quickly appeared. It was especially popular with film costumes due to the glimmer of the metal, and the figure hugging potential of the tulle. While the Western film industry became infatuated with tulle bi telli, so did the Egyptian film industry. The tulle bi telli dresses of Egyptian dancers, especially on film, were either made from shawls, or were reproductions of traditional dresses. However, the telli of the latter was certainly not silver as that would be expensive, and there were no facings on the dresses as they were not worn with under dresses, and the facings would be very obvious. Most dancers dresses today are made from shawls.

Before the popularization of electroplating, which made copper strips plated with more expensive metals available, telli and garments featuring it would have been more luxurious items, not easily afforded by poorer women. The decreased cost of making telli strips also made telli embroidery less profitable. The popularization of tulle bi telli over telli work done on solid weave fabric made it easier to produce, as the grid made for easy patterning and decreased the difficulty of managing the telli strips during production. This led to a decline in professional embroiderers who used solid weave fabrics, as well as contributing to the decline of traditional telli dress making in Egypt. Instead, telli embroidery shifted to a product made for export. Simultaneously, embroiderers of tulle bi telli felt free to break tradition and exercise personal creativity in making patterns.

== Uses ==
Assuit has been used in Hollywood production a large scale ions such as the 1934 Cecil B. DeMille opus Cleopatra. It was draped on Hedy Lamarr in Samson and Delilah. It is used extensively for dresses in old Egyptian musicals. It was also worn draped over the head, as wraps, and as wedding gowns. Folkloric Belly Dancers often make costumes from it. It can also be used for decoration: Piano shawls were extremely popular, and specimens can still be found occasionally in antique shops.

Shawls come in different sizes: most are long and narrow, and the designs vary, ranging from the simple to the elaborate. Some people believe designs have been passed down through families, as with weaving and embroidery work. Some designs appear to be intentionally left incomplete. Coptic Christian designs often have animal and human figures, whereas Muslim shawls rely on geometric designs. In some places, assuit shawls are incorrectly referred to as Coptic shawls. The geometric designs were popular with the Art Deco movement, beginning around 1925.

== See also ==
- Muqayyash
- Kerikam
- Egyptian cultural fashion
