= Muqayyash =

Old craft of brocade work

Mukaish (Muqqaish, Mukkaiish, Muqayyash, Mukesh, मुक़य्यश, "مخيش" ) is an ancient craft of brocade embroidery work with silver metal yarn on silk cloth from Lucknow, India. The silk is ornamented with a silver stripe pattern. Muqayyash is one of the Mughal period silk cloth, and it is recorded in Ain-i-Akbari.

== Name ==
Muqayyash is an Arabicized word driven from the Hindi word Kesh, which means hairs. Muqayyash is also known as badla and fardi work. The Mukaish work with smaller stitch was called Murri ka kaam, taka, dana.

== Use ==
Muqayyash has been in use since at least the Mughal empire, and Nur Jahan wore such silver embellished clothes. However, it may be older. Originally, it was used to make small embellishments to clothes in conjunction with chikankari embroidery, but recent designs have started to use it more extensively by itself. It may be done on a variety of base fabrics, from chiffon to sturdier silks.

=== Present fashion ===
Silk clothes with Muqayyash work are famous for bridal and festival wear and ladies sari. Muqayyash work is still fashionable with celebrities in Bollywood. It is one of the techniques favored by Indian fashion designers like Manish Malhotra, Anjul Bhandari, and more. Priyanka Chopra wore a mukaish work ivory sari while receiving the Danny Kaye Humanitarian Award at the 2019 UNICEF Snowflake Ball on December 3. The sari was designed by Abu Jani Sandeep Khosla.

In early July 2025, Luxury fashion brand Dior faced backlash for appropriating mukaish work, in a $200,000 coat from Jonathan Anderson's debut collection. Critics, including fashion commentator Hanan Besnovic, highlight that while the coat took 34 days and 12 embroiderers to create, Dior has failed to credit the Indian artisans and the origin of the craftsmanship. This incident follows closely on the heels of a similar controversy involving Prada and its uncredited use of Indian Kolhapuri chappals, reigniting the debate about cultural appropriation and the lack of recognition for traditional artisans in the high-fashion industry.

== See also ==
- Brocade
- Bafta cloth
- Tansukh cloth
- Khasa (cloth)
