= Lavaud S. Paulo =

Brazilian aircraft

S. Paulo
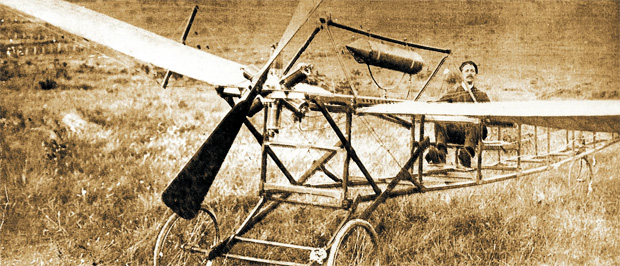
- Lavaud in the airplane S. Paulo, 1910

General information
- Type: Experimental aircraft
- National origin: Brazil
- Manufacturer: Lourenço Pellegati
- Designer: Dimitri Sansaud de Lavaud
- Number built: 1

History
- First flight: 7 January 1910

The S. Paulo was a Brazilian single-engine, single seat aircraft, was the first airplane to fly in Latin America.

== Design and development ==
It was the first airplane with a totally national project manufactured in Brazil. Lavaud began work on it in 1908, and the engine was cast and machined in São Paulo. The skeleton of the aircraft was made of sarrafo de pinho and peroba, and the outer shell was varnished with cretonne. The propeller was made by carpenter Antônio Damasso, using jequitibá wood.

It flew for the first time in January 1910, in Osasco. The event was followed by dozens of people, documented by Estadão. It flew for 6 seconds over a distance of 103 meters, at a height of 3 or 4 meters.

== Specifications ==
Data from Pereira 1986, p. 2

General characteristics

- Crew: 1
- Length: 10.20 m (33 ft 6 in)
- Upper wingspan: 10 m (32 ft 10 in)
- Wing area: 18 m^{2} (190 sq ft)
- Powerplant: 1 × Nacional 6-cylinder rotary engine, 34 kW (45 hp)
- Propellers: 2-bladed, 2.10 m (6 ft 11 in) diameter

Performance

- Maximum speed: 54 km/h (34 mph, 29 kn)
