= Royal Winton =

English ceramics brand

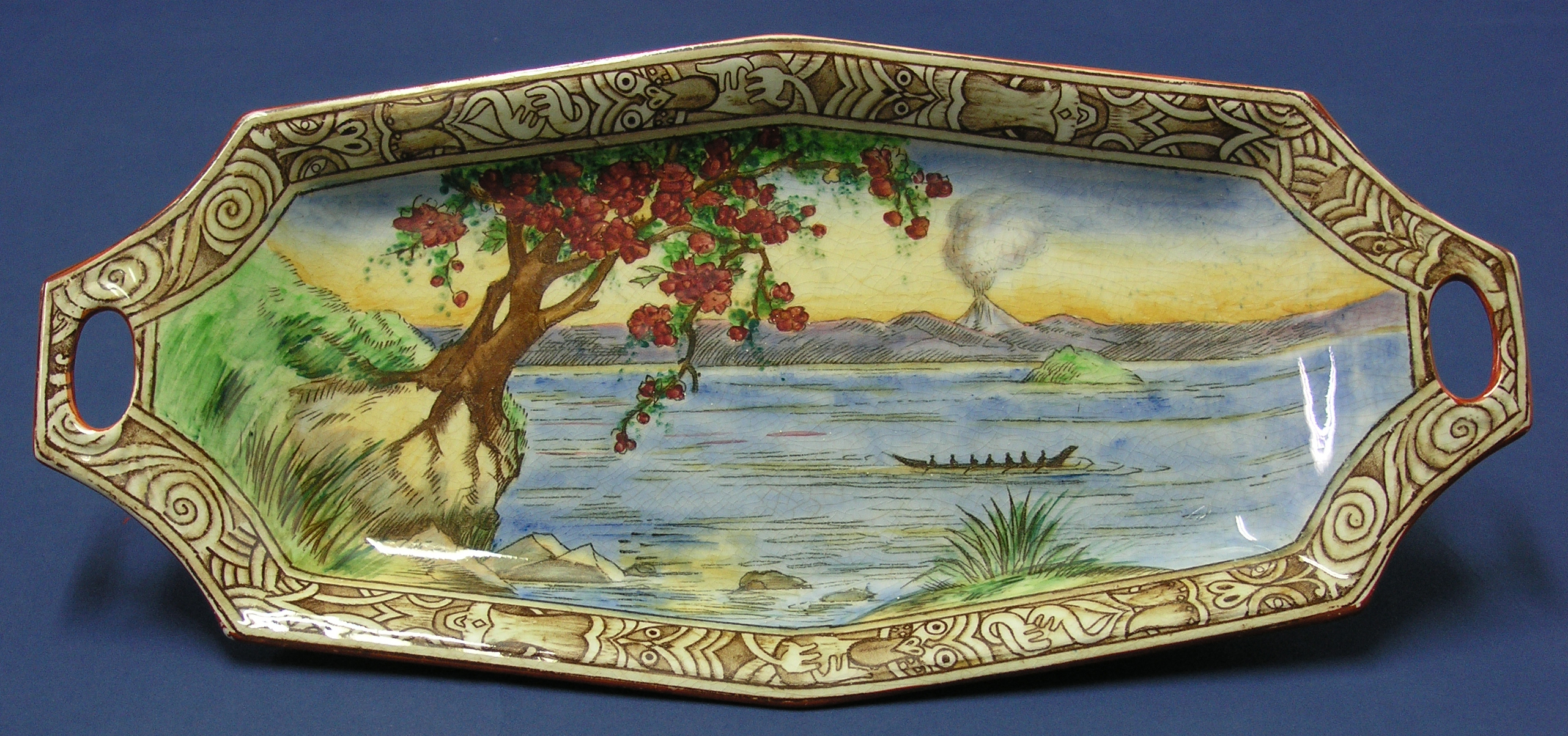
"Maoriland" dish

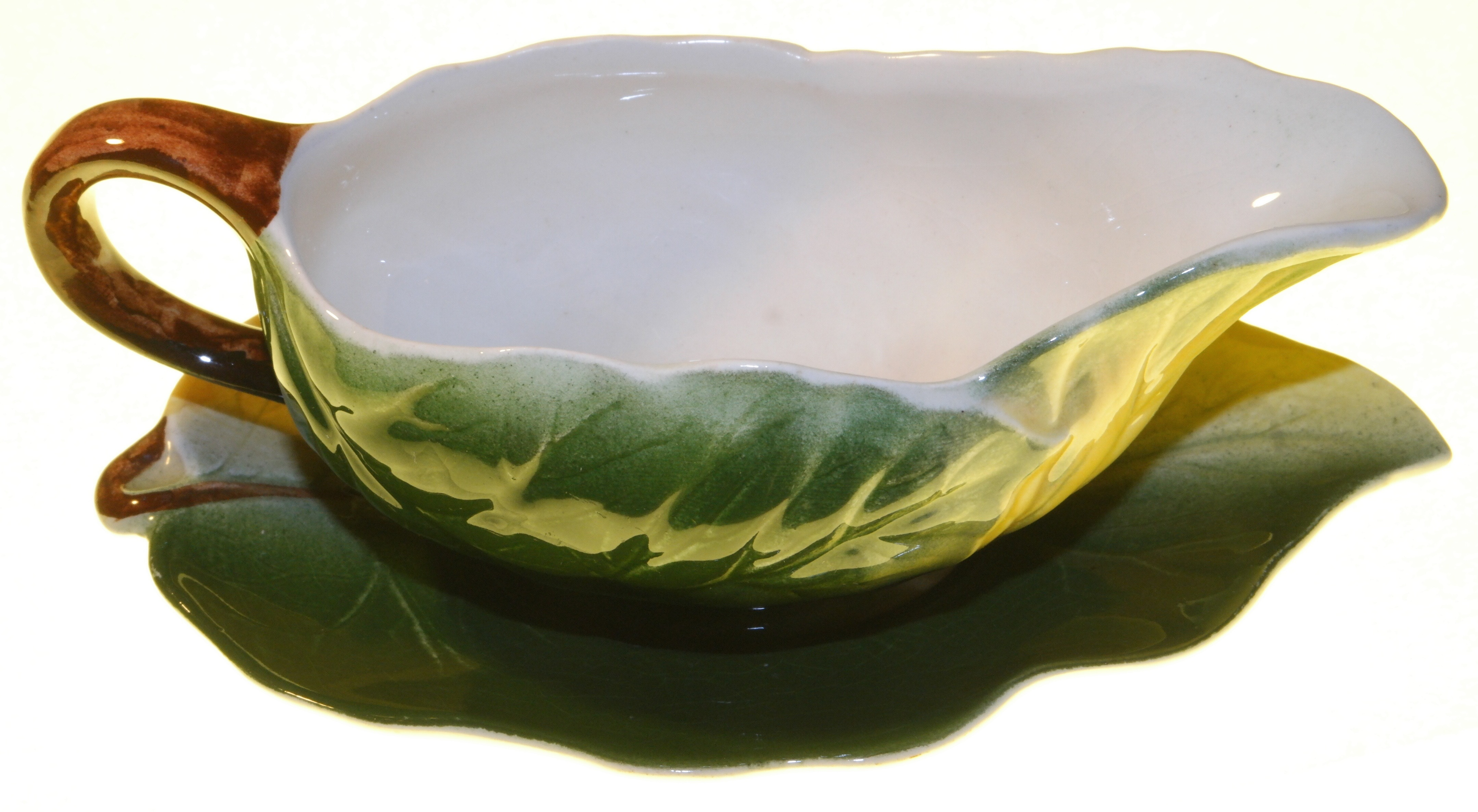
Royal Winton gravy boat and saucer, leaf style, 1950s.

Royal Winton is an English brand of ceramics, made by Grimwades Limited, a Stoke-on-Trent based company founded in 1885. The brand is particularly associated with chintzware.

== History ==
The company was founded by Leonard Lumsden Grimwade, an experienced pottery modeller, in 1885; he was joined by his brother Sidney Richard Grimwade, also a potter. By 1906 Grimwades Ltd had four factories in the Potteries, and King George V and Queen Mary visited in 1913.

In 1928 the company began to produce chintzware, floral patterns inspired by textiles of the period. The first pattern was "Marguerite". Soon afterwards the trade name "Royal Winton" was established. Leonard Grimwade died in 1931, and James Plant took over. Over subsequent years, more than sixty chintz patterns were introduced. Because of high production costs, chintzware was discontinued in the early 1960s.

In 1979 the company was acquired by Staffordshire Potteries Ltd, which was bought by Coloroll in 1986. In 1995 the company was bought out by the management; its name reverted to Grimwades Ltd, and traded as Royal Winton. Interest in chintzware had grown, with the publication of reference books and antiques auctions dedicated to it. It was realised that there was a demand for Royal Winton chintz products, so some of the popular designs were reintroduced, reviving old lithographing techniques. The backstamp included the year 1995, to avoid confusion with earlier pieces. In 1997 the first new piece of chintzware since the 1960s was introduced.

In 1999 Grimwades Ltd purchased Duchess China, of Longton in the Potteries, out of administration.
