= Kota Doria =

Type of lightweight woven fabric

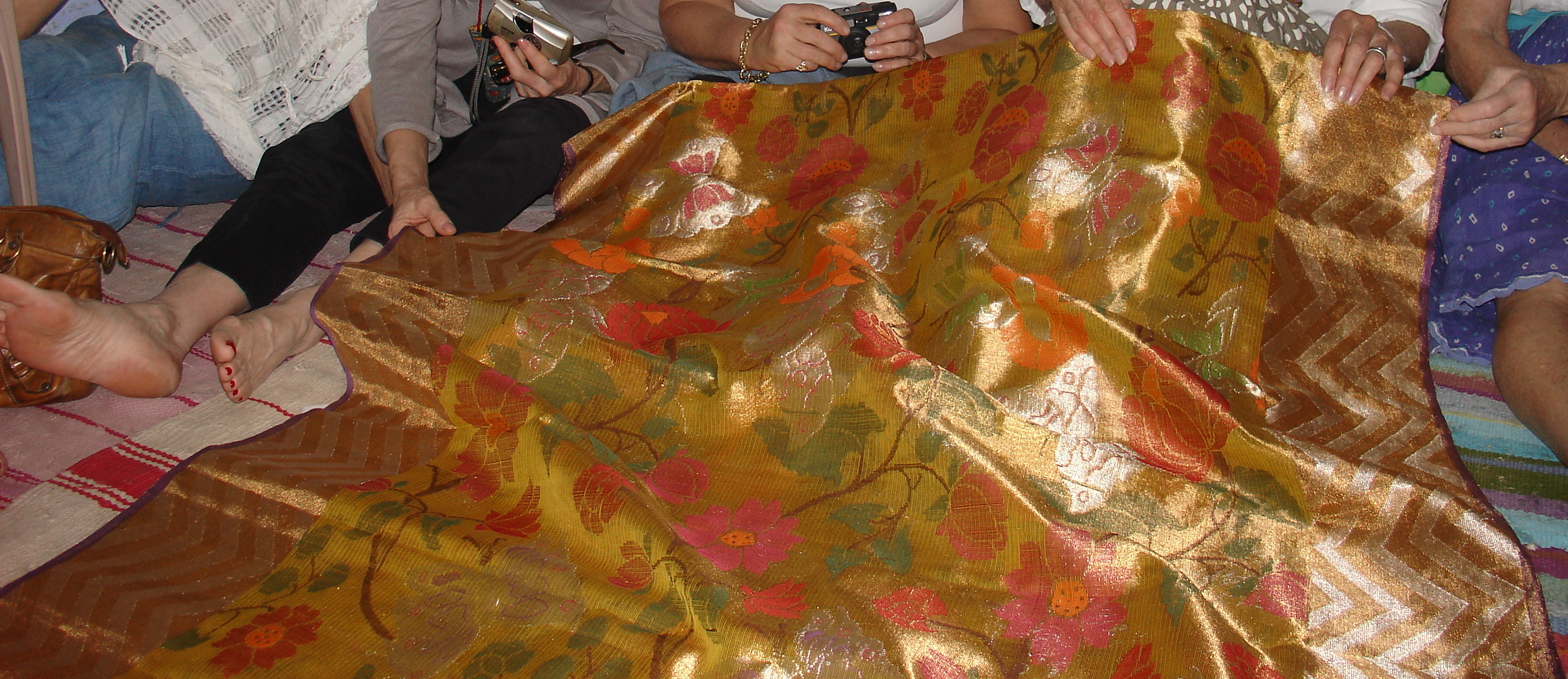
Handloomed kota doria

Kota Doria or Kota Doriya is the name of a light woven fabric made of tiny woven squares (khat) which is still handwoven on traditional pit looms in Kaithoon near Kota in Rajasthan and in some of the surrounding villages. Kota Doriya Sarees are made of pure cotton and silk and have square like patterns known as khats on them. The chequered weave of a Kota sari is very popular for their lightweight and comfortable wear. They are very fine weaves and weigh very little.

== History ==
It is said that jhala zalim singh of Kotah brought weavers from Mysore in Karnataka to Kotah, in the mid 17th century, as they wove a characteristic small squared lightweight cotton fabric that looks like graph paper and is suitable for turbans. Rao Kishore Singh died in a battle in Karnataka in 1696 while fighting for the Mughal Emperor Aurangzeb.

== Weave ==
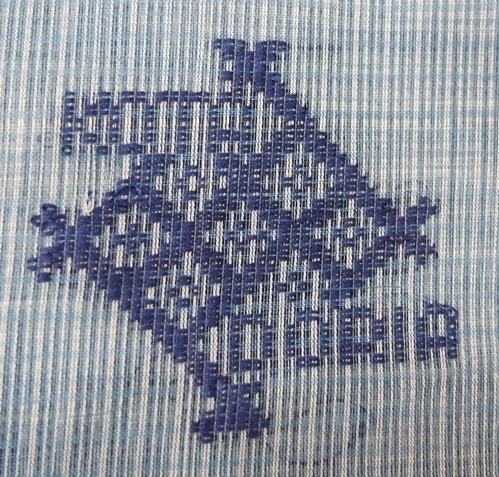
Mark of a genuine handloom Kota Doria product

Since the weavers had come from Mysore, the fabric produced was called kota masuriya. It was woven on narrow 8 inch looms to make the traditional paags (turbans) and later on broader looms used for gossamer light saris. Silk was added to the cotton in a 20:80 ratio approximately to give the sari strength. This has become the usual cotton silk Kota Doria blend. Nowadays hand woven silk Kota Doria saris have also become popular. At first the design known as a buti was small and regular but larger designs are now made according to fashion and taste. A standard sari is 6.5 metres long and includes the blouse piece. A very ornate sari can take one month to make and is an heirloom piece to be treasured. A genuine Kota Doria sari will contain the GI mark woven in one corner indicating that it has been hand woven using real silver and gold thread.

Most Kota Doria or Kota Doriya saris are made on power looms in Surat and Varanasi and may be hand block printed, embroidered or hand finished in a variety of ways. The fabric is also used as dress fabric and for stoles and dupattas.

== See also ==
- Mysore silk
- Mulmul
- Khasa (cloth)
- Tansukh cloth
