= Dorea (disambiguation) =

Dorea is a genus of bacteria.

Dorea may also refer to:

- Dorea (cloth), a striped cloth from India
- Dorea Sand, a character in the A Song of Ice and Fire novels
