= Gaji =

One of the indigenous coarse cotton varieties of India

Gaji (Gaji cloth) is a coarse cloth made primarily of cotton or silk that is used for native Indian dresses.

== Structure ==
Gaji was similar to khaddar, a rough, coarse material made on handloom by local Julahas (weavers) with cotton or silk. A comparable cloth was garha. The fabric was durable and warm.

=== Use ===
Because of its coarse texture, the fabric was proper in winters for poor. Men and women both were using Gaji; men wore angochha (headwear), dhoti, jacket, and blanket, and women wrapped it as sari and used in chemises.

== Production ==
The handloom cotton products, including Gaji, were produced in many parts of India; Gaji chiefly was produced in Gujarat, parts of Uttar Pradesh such as Jaunpur, Bareilly and Bengal. Gaji weavers took a significant hit when power looms made their entry.

The Gaji cloth was also one of the products produced in the Jail industry in Mewar.

== See also ==
- Khadi
- Longcloth
