= Nillaes =

17th century blue striped cloth

Nillae (nillaes) was an India term for a type of blue colored cloth. It was either entirely made of silk or a blend of silk and cotton with a blue striped pattern. Nillaes were produced in a variety of beautiful hues. Midnapore and Balasore both were producing the cloth.

== Etymology ==
The term is derived from the Hindi word 'Nila,' which means 'blue.'

== Quotes ==
- striped cloth of mixed Tussur silk and cotton, occasionally flowered
  — (Irwin and Schwartz)
- the sort that are finest and most Glossy and striped with the lightest colours as hair colour, sky colour and the like, but those that are Red and Tauny ground striped with black are not vendible
  — (Irwin and Schwartz)

== Exports ==
In the seventeenth century, Nillaes were among the notable Indian goods exported from Bengal. Records suggest that Samuel Rowland Fisher ordered 15 pieces of Nillaes in 1767 with a price of 17 Shilling per piece.

== See also ==
- Salu (cloth), a red cloth.
