= Turkey red =

Color

Color coordinates
- Hex triplet: #A91101
- sRGB^{B} (r, g, b): (169, 17, 1)
- HSV (h, s, v): (6°, 99%, 66%)
- CIELCh_{uv} (L, C, h): (36, 114, 13°)
- Source: Underthemoonlight
- ISCC–NBS descriptor: Strong reddish brown
- B: Normalized to [0–255] (byte)

Turkey red is a dyeing method that was widely used to give cotton a distinctive bright red colour in the 18th and 19th centuries. The method was invented by Greeks of the Ottoman Empire, in particular in Adrianople and Ampelakia.

The dye was made using the root of the rubia (madder) plant, through a long and laborious process which originated in the historical Levant region and was further developed in India and China. Around 1746, two French industrialists, d'Haristoy and Goudard, persuaded Greek dyers from Smyrna to introduce Turkey red dyeing to France, establishing works near Rouen and in Languedoc.

== History ==
As the Industrial Revolution spread across Europe, chemists and manufacturers sought new red dyes that could be used for large-scale manufacture of textiles. One colour imported into Europe from Asia in the 18th and early 19th century was Turkey red, known in France as rouge d'Andrinople.

Turkey red used the root of the rubia (madder) plant as the colorant, but the process was long and complicated, involving multiple soakings of the fabrics in lye, castor oil, sheep's dung, and other ingredients.

Turkey red fabric was more expensive but resulted in a fine bright and lasting red, similar to carmine, perfectly suited to cotton, a fabric to which it had previously proven difficult to affix dye. Aiding the colouring of Turkey red was the discovery of mordants in India; mordants create a bond between dyestuffs and fibres, and the volume of mordant applied to fibres impacts the strength of hue which the fibre or cloth takes on. The Turkey red technique was used to dye and produce plain woven cotton cloths, which could also be used as a base for printing, using wooden blocks, copper plates, and/or cylindrical printing methods.

Turkey red achieved its popularity as a natural dye for several reasons, namely that it was colourfast – it did not fade in light or when washed, and did not transfer colour to other fabrics, proving that completed fabrics could be used in both clothing and furnishing.

Beginning in the 1740s, this bright red colour was used to dye and print cotton textiles in England, Scotland, the Netherlands and France. Turkey red fabric, while retailed in Europe, was widely created for the export market, traded from Europe to India, Africa, the Middle East and America, often to the detriment of the local economy, trade, and artisans. Designs were often appropriated and cheaply retailed. In 19th-century America, Turkey red was widely used in making traditional patchwork quilts.

== Turkey red and Scotland ==
The Turkey red dyeing technique was introduced to Scotland by French chemist Pierre Jacques Papillon. Papillon, working with dyer George Macintosh and David Dale, founded in 1785 the first Turkey red dyeworks in Dalmarnock, Scotland.

Harnessing the business potential of the growing Turkey red market, numerous manufacturers also established their bleachfields, dyeworks and printworks in the Vale of Leven, as well as at several sites around Glasgow. At this time, the Vale of Leven, further up the river from Dalmarnock, was already the site of several bleachfields and printworks, and with ready supply of clean water from the river Leven, it was well suited to such production as Turkey red. The Vale of Leven became recognised as a centre of Turkey red production in the 1820s.

Manchester remained a key British competitor of the Turkey red industry in Scotland, and with expansion of production in India towards the end of the 19th century, the Scottish Turkey red trade was further challenged. However, the profitability of production in Scotland endured. Amalgamation of the industry-leading Archibald Orr Ewing and Co., John Orr Ewing and Co., and William Stirling and Sons established the United Turkey Red Company Ltd in 1898, which continued to produce and trade until 1961, marking the end of the Turkey red industry in the Vale of Leven.

== Process ==
The process of dyeing cotton Turkey red, as it was practiced in the Ottoman Empire in the 18th century, was created by Greeks of the Ottoman Empire, in particular in the cities of Adrianople and Ampelakia. Greek dyers brought the method initially to Rouen, Lyons and Languedoc in France, afterwards spreading it throughout the rest of Europe.

Except a colour, Turkey red is also a manufacturing technique and a process.

To obtain Turkish red, there are two basic stages: mordanting and dyeing.

MORDANTING

1. Cotton yarn is soaked in Turkey red oil for 2 hours.
2. It is thoroughly rinsed with water, wrung out, and left to dry in the open air for 3 days.
3. First mordanting: It is soaked with 6% tannin at 40–55 °C for 12 hours.
4. The yarn is removed from the mordant bath and left to dry.
5. Second mordanting: It is soaked in a mixture of 100% alum, 9% sodium carbonate, 3% calcium carbonate, and 7% glacial acetic acid at 55 °C for 12 hours.
6. The yarn is removed from the mordant bath and left to dry.

DYEING

1. The mordanted cotton yarn and a liquid consisting of 200% madder root, 4% tannin, 1.4% calcium carbonate, and 1% Turkey red oil are slowly heated to 75 °C and kept at this temperature for one hour.
2. The yarn is removed from the dye bath, thoroughly rinsed with water, wrung out, and left to dry.
3. The dyed and dried yarn is soaked in a mixture of 3% soap, 0.85% sodium carbonate, tin, and 0.65% chloride for 1–2 hours.
4. The yarn is removed from the washing bath, rinsed with water, and left to dry.

The method was described in a text by a Manchester dyer in 1786 as such:

1. Boil cotton in lye of Barilla or wood ash
2. Wash and dry
3. Steep in a liquor of Barilla ash or soda plus sheep's dung and turkey red oil (emulsified castor oil)
4. Rinse, let stand 12 hours, dry
5. Repeat steps 3 and 4 three times.
6. Steep in a fresh liquor of Barilla ash or soda, sheep's dung, turkey red oil and white argol (potassium tartrate).
7. Rinse and dry
8. Repeat steps 6 and 7 three times.
9. Treat with gall nut solution
10. Wash and dry
11. Repeat steps 9 and 10 once.
12. Treat with a solution of alum, or alum mixed with ashes and Saccharum Saturni (lead acetate).
13. Dry, wash, dry.
14. Madder once or twice with Turkey madder to which a little sheep's blood is added.
15. Wash
16. Boil in a lye made of soda ash or the dung liquor
17. Wash and dry.

== See also ==
- Salu (cloth), a turkey red colored cloth.
