= Divan-i-Albisa =

15th-century Persian language manuscript

Divan-i-Albisa (Diwan-i-Albisa) is a 15th-century Persian language manuscript authored by Nizam al-Din Mahmud Qari of Yazd. Divan-i-Albisa is a collection of poems about clothes. It suggests on the origins of textiles and their importation into Persian markets from "Asia (Rum), Cathay (Khita), and Hindustan".

== See also ==
- Salu (cloth)
- Diwan (poetry)
