= Gurrah (cloth) =

Kind of calico produced in Northeast India in the 1700s

Gurrah (garha) was a kind of calico produced in Northeast India during the 18th century. Gurrah was one of the cotton piece goods exported to England and France.

== Name ==
Gurrah may be a name stemming from Hindi garha.

== Characteristics ==
Gurrah was a typical quality plain cloth. It was an unbleached cotton material.

== Use ==
It was processed and used in many household items such as table cloth, etc. Gurrah was also used for printing base material in England and France. Gurrah was also part of the Indian cloths exported to America.

Gurrah has been mentioned as a dress material in petticoat.

== See also ==
- Bafta cloth
