= Kaithoon =

- city
- Location in Rajasthan, India Kaithoon (India)
- Coordinates: 25.1407°N 75.9679°E
- Country: India
- State: Rajasthan
- District: Kota

Population (2001)
  - Total: 20,362

Languages
  - Official: Hindi
- Time zone: UTC+5:30 (IST)

Kaithoon is a town and a municipality in Kota district in the Indian state of Rajasthan. The place is popular for its sarees known as Kota Doria.

== Demographics ==
As of 2001 India census, Kaithoon had a population of 20,362. Males constitute 52% of the population and females 48%. Kaithoon has an average literacy rate of 62%, higher than the national average of 59.5%: male literacy is 73%, and female literacy is 51%. In Kaithoon, 17% of the population is under 6 years of age.
