= Chintzware =

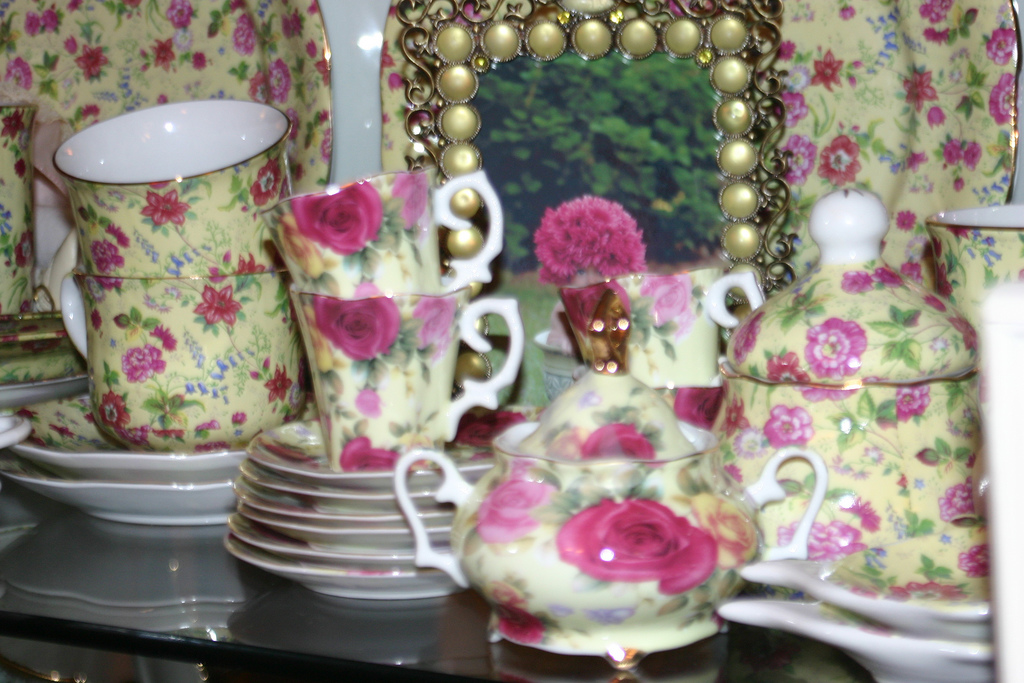
Reproduction chintz pattern china tea set, late 20th century

Chintzware, or chintz pottery, describes chinaware and pottery covered with a dense, all-over pattern of flowers (similar to chintz textile patterns) or, less often, other objects. It is a form of transferware where the pattern is applied by transfer printing as opposed to the more traditional method of painting by hand.

The main firms making chintzware were English, nearly all part of the huge Staffordshire pottery industry. including Grimwades (trade name Royal Winton), A.G. Richardson & Co. (trade name Crown Ducal), James Kent Ltd., Shelley Potteries Ltd., and Elijah Cotton Ltd. (trade name Lord Nelson), and between them turned out a great variety of chintz dinnerware, teaware, and ornamental pieces mostly from the 1920s to the 1960s. There were over 50 different patterns in various colours available. While often made in pottery, some manufacturers such as Shelley produced bone china chintzware, particularly after World War II. Chintzware was also copied at the time by German, Czech and Japanese manufacturers.

Royal Winton began reproducing a few of their chintz patterns in the mid-to-late 1990s.
