= Shalloon =

Shalloon is a fine serge wool fabric, formerly used for lining garments; and for specialised applications such as wig bands, and for military applications such as separating the propellant charge from the shell and for binding large powder bags for larger artillery pieces, especially naval artillery and coastal artillery. Due to its association with artillery, shalloon was also used as a term synonymous with armoury.

Shalloon derives its name from Châlons-sur-Marne (now called Châlons-en-Champagne), where the cloth was first developed. Because of the similarity of names, it was sometimes confused with salu, a fabric originating in India, and with challis.
