= Tansukh cloth =

Delicate cotton cloth, the name means comforting the body.

Tansukh cloth was a fine cotton cloth primarily used for feminine dresses in medieval India, Tansukh is one of the seven explicitly mentioned cloths (khasa, Salu, Doriya, Bafta, Dupatta, and Panchtoliya) named in the exhaustive list of cotton cloths in Ain-i-Akbari. The bodices made of Tansukh and Bafta are referred by the poet Bhikhari Das. Tansukh was a woven material with another class of muslin with a very soft and delicate texture.

== Etymology ==
'Tansuk' or 'Tansukh' means in Hindi language, "comforting to the body" or "pleasing to the body".

== History ==
The Ain-i-Akbari and the contemporary Hindi writers mentioned Tansukh and Khasa, Bafta, Salu, Doriya, Dupatta, and Panchtoliya as notable fabrics of their time. The special quotes some names like chira, fenta gangajal fabric, Tansukh, sari, lehenga, ghagra, etc., signify the use of these cloths in Mughal clothing.

== Material and texture ==
Tansukh was made of fine cotton yarns. The texture of the fabric was very soft and delicate.

== Use ==
Tansukh was a soft cloth made of cotton and it was used for feminine dresses such as bodices (angiya, kanchukis ), saris, skirts with a piece of cloth across the breasts. The clothes made of Tansukh were suitable for both outer and inner wear.

== See also ==
- Bafta cloth
- Khasa (cloth)
