= Diwan (poetry) =

Collection of poems in Islamic cultures

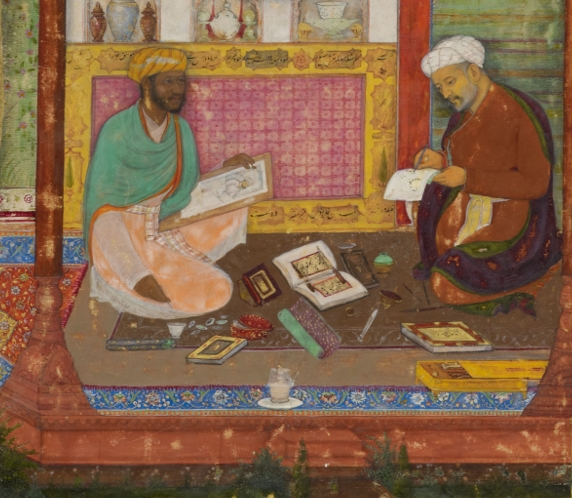
A Mughal scribe and Daulat, his illustrator, from a manuscript of the Khamsa of Nizami, one of the most famous Persian diwan collections

A diwan (from Persian دیوان divân [d̪iːˈvɒːn]; Arabic pronunciation: [diːˈwaːn]) is a collection of poems by a single author – usually excluding the poet's long poems – in Islamic cultures of West Asia, Central Asia, North Africa, Sicily and South Asia.

The vast majority of Diwan poetry was lyric in nature: either ghazals (or gazels, which make up the greatest part of the repertoire of the tradition) or kasîdes. There were, however, other common genres, most particularly the mesnevî—a kind of verse romance and thus a variety of narrative poetry; the two most notable examples of this form are the Layla and Majnun (ليلى و مجنون) of Fuzûlî and the Hüsn ü Aşk (حسن و عشق – 'Beauty and Love') of Şeyh Gâlib.

Originating in Persian literature, the idea spread to the Arab, Turkic and Indic worlds, and the term was sometimes used in Europe, albeit not always in the same way.

== Etymology ==
The English usage of the phrase "diwan poetry" comes from the Persian word diwān (دیوان) via Ottoman Turkish, and designated a list or register. The Persian word derived from the Persian dibir meaning writer or scribe. Diwan was also borrowed into Armenian, Georgian, Arabic, Urdu, Turkish. In Persian, Turkish and other languages the term diwan came to mean a collection of poems by a single author, as in selected works, or the whole body of work of a poet. Thus Diwan-e Mir would be the Collected works of Mir Taqi Mir and so on. The first use of the term in this sense is attributed to Rudaki.

The term divan was used in titles of poetic works in French, beginning in 1697, but was a rare and didactic usage, though one that was revived by its famous appearance in Goethe's West–östlicher Divan (Poems of West and East), a work published in 1819 that reflected the poet's abiding interest in Middle Eastern and specifically Persian literature.

This word has also been applied in a similar way to collections of Hebrew poetry and to poetry of al-Andalus.

== Symbolism ==
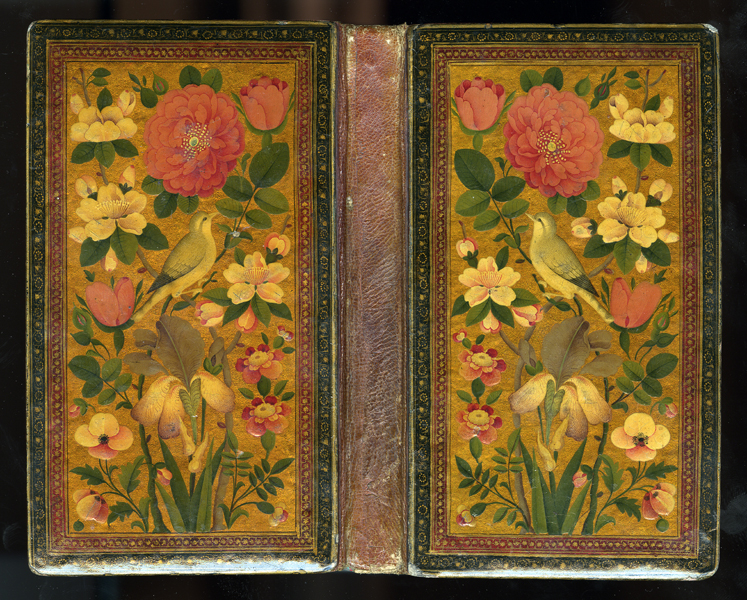
Rose and nightingale on the binding of a Divan of Hafiz (Iran, 1842)

Ottoman Divan poetry was a highly ritualized and symbolic art form. From the Persian poetry that largely inspired it, it inherited a wealth of symbols whose meanings and interrelationships—both of similitude (مراعات نظير mura'ât-i nazîr / تناسب tenâsüb) and opposition (تضاد tezâd)—were more or less prescribed. Examples of prevalent symbols that, to some extent, oppose one another include, among others:

- the nightingale (بلبل bolbol) – the rose (ﮔل gol)
- the world (جهان cihan; عالم ‘âlem) – the rosegarden (ﮔﻠﺴﺘﺎن golistan; ﮔﻠﺸﻦ golshen)
- the ascetic (زاهد zâhid) – the dervish (درويش darvish)

As the opposition of "the ascetic" and "the darvish" suggests, Divan poetry—much like Turkish folk poetry—was heavily influenced by Sufi thought. One of the primary characteristics of Divan poetry, however—as of the Persian poetry before it—was its mingling of the mystical Sufi element with a profane and even erotic element. Thus, the pairing of "the nightingale" and "the rose" simultaneously suggests two different relationships:

- the relationship between the fervent lover ("the nightingale") and the inconstant beloved ("the rose")
- the relationship between the individual Sufi practitioner (who is often characterized in Sufism as a lover) and God (who is considered the ultimate source and object of love)

Similarly, "the world" refers simultaneously to the physical world and to this physical world considered as the abode of sorrow and impermanence, while "the rosegarden" refers simultaneously to a literal garden and to the garden of Paradise. "The nightingale", or suffering lover, is often seen as situated—both literally and figuratively—in "the world", while "the rose", or beloved, is seen as being in "the rosegarden".

Divan poetry was composed through the constant juxtaposition of many such images within a strict metrical framework, thus allowing numerous potential meanings to emerge. A brief example is the following line of verse, or mısra (مصراع), by the 18th-century judge and poet Hayatî Efendi:

بر گل مى وار بو گلشن ﻋالمدﻪ خارسز
Bir gül mü var bu gülşen-i ‘âlemde hârsız
("Does any rose, in this rosegarden world, lack thorns?")

Here, the nightingale is only implied (as being the poet/lover), while the rose, or beloved, is shown to be capable of inflicting pain with its thorns (خار hâr). The world, as a result, is seen as having both positive aspects (it is a rosegarden, and thus analogous to the garden of Paradise) and negative aspects (it is a rosegarden full of thorns, and thus different from the garden of Paradise).

== Development ==
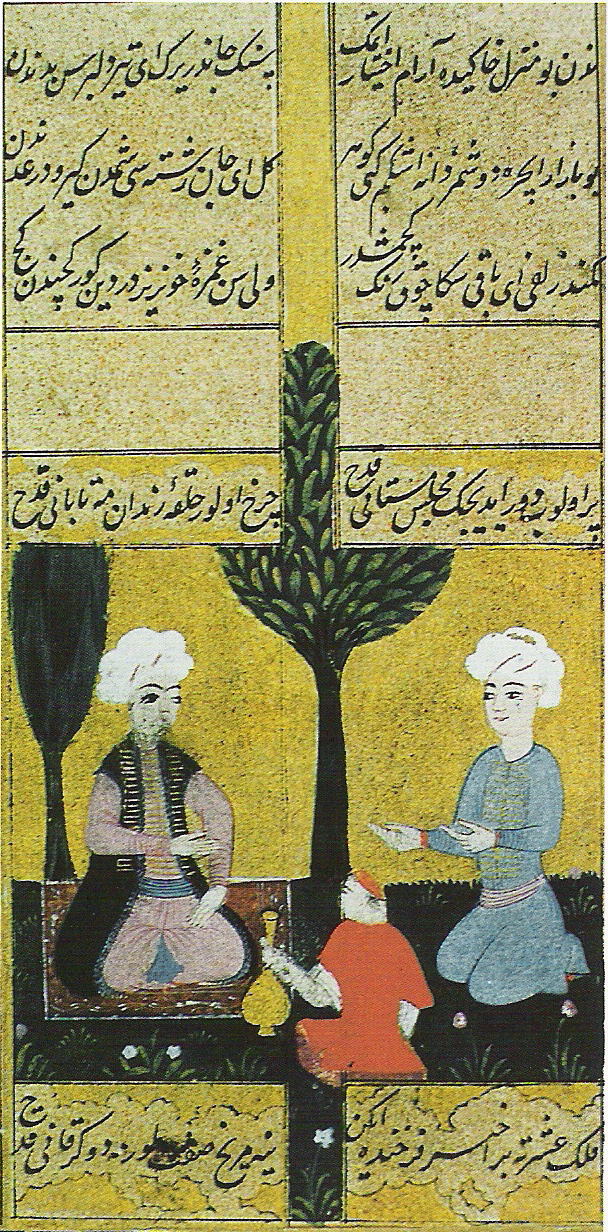
Ottoman garden party, with poet, guest, and winebearer; from the 16th-century Dîvân-ı Bâkî

As for the development of Divan poetry over the more than 500 years of its existence, that is—as the Ottomanist Walter G. Andrews points out—a study still in its infancy; clearly defined movements and periods have not yet been decided upon. Early in the history of the tradition, the Persian influence was very strong, but this was mitigated somewhat through the influence of poets such as the Azerbaijani Imadaddin Nasimi (?–1417?) and the Uyghur Ali-Shir Nava'i (1441–1501), both of whom offered strong arguments for the poetic status of the Turkic languages as against the much-venerated Persian. Partly as a result of such arguments, Divan poetry in its strongest period—from the 16th to the 18th centuries—came to display a unique balance of Persian and Turkish elements, until the Persian influence began to predominate again in the early 19th century.

Despite the lack of certainty regarding the stylistic movements and periods of Divan poetry, however, certain highly different styles are clear enough, and can perhaps be seen as exemplified by certain poets:

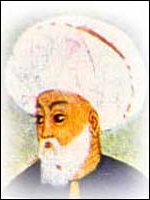
Fuzûlî (1483?–1556), Divan poet of Azeri origin

- Fuzûlî (1483?–1556); a unique poet who wrote with equal skill in Azeri Turkish, Persian, and Arabic, and who came to be as influential in Persian as in Divan poetry
- Bâkî (1526–1600); a poet of great rhetorical power and linguistic subtlety whose skill in using the pre-established tropes of the Divan tradition is quite representative of the poetry in the time of Süleyman the Magnificent
- Nef‘î (1570?–1635); a poet considered the master of the kasîde (a kind of panegyric), as well as being known for his harshly satirical poems, which led to his execution
- Nâbî (1642–1712); a poet who wrote a number of socially oriented poems critical of the stagnation period of Ottoman history
- Nedîm (1681?–1730); a revolutionary poet of the Tulip Era of Ottoman history, who infused the rather élite and abstruse language of Divan poetry with numerous simpler, populist elements
- Şeyh Gâlib (1757–1799); a poet of the Mevlevî Sufi order whose work is considered the culmination of the highly complex so-called "Indian style" (سبك هندى sebk-i hindî)

== Urdu variation ==
In Urdu poetry diwan are also a collection of poems, but here they are mainly ghazals.

== See also ==
- Anthology
- Arabic literature
- Early Modern literature
- Poetic meter of Ottoman Turkish
- Ottoman divan poets (Category)
- Mathnawi (poetic form)
- Divan-i-Albisa
