= Peshgeer =

Cotton printed cloth made of English threads, used for petticoats for poor people

Peshgeer is one of the obsolete cotton piece goods produced in the Indian subcontinent. Peshgeer was a type of woven, printed material.

== Mentions ==
John Forbes Watson describes Peshgeer as cotton printed cloth made of English threads, used in "petticoats of poorer classes". A sample in Fabric book gives its origin as Shikarpore, in the Sind province of Pakistan.

== Price ==
In the mid-1800s, Palle-manufactured Peshgeer was priced in the range of Rs 22-40/piece.
