= Coloroll =

United Kingdom wallpaper brand

Coloroll is a British wallpaper brand owned by CWV Ltd.

Developed from a family-owned wallpaper company founded in the 1970s, during the 1980s Coloroll Group became a dominant publicly listed home furnishings business, which collapsed in 1990 through excessive debt. Of the ten residual brands that survived the collapse, nine of the businesses survive presently.

== Foundation ==
The company was founded in 1970 by the Gatward family, as a printed paper bag manufacturer. After hiring marketing manager John Bray, he developed a strategy to move into wallpaper manufacture. Hiring designers John Wilman and Linda Beard, they developed a range similar to the classic fashion look developed by Welsh entrepreneur Laura Ashley. To develop new overseas markets, Bray hired John Ashcroft from competitor Crown Wallpaper as export manager.

== Coloroll Group ==
Appointed managing director in 1981, Ashcroft bought the Gatwards and Bray out of the business in 1984.

Ashcroft's strategy was to extend the Wilman/Beard designs across a range of home furnishings, to provide a co-ordinated whole home look to the consumer. After floating the business in 1985 – leading shareholders included the pension funds of Scottish Amicable and British Coal – the company spent £420 million in the next five years on acquisitions, of which £16 million was spent in the United States, taking the strategic vision into a reality.

The brands they bought included:

- Alexander Drew, printing
- Burlington Wallcoverings, later sold to Graham & Brown
- Denby Pottery Company
- Edinburgh Crystal
- Kosset Carpets
- Royal Winton
- Staffordshire Potteries Ltd, sold off in the collapse of 1990 as Staffordshire Tableware
- William Barrett Group, furniture, later bought by property developers with assets sold to Hampson Industries
- Edward Fogarty, duvet/pillow supplier
- Walmates Vinyl, US wallpaper manufacturer

=== Collapse ===
In 1988, the group paid £215 million for recently created clothing and carpet conglomerate John Crowther, which had not itself been fully integrated. When Coloroll bought the John Crowther group they acquired Herbert Johnson. Coloroll sold this London firm of hatters to a management buy-out team called the Response Group. In 1989, the United States wallpaper operations were sold off to create cash. In 1990, a refinancing exercise led to an audit by the banks that showed that group debt was at £350 million. Refusing to underwrite the rising debt without an additional capital injection, proposed buyer Candover Investments withdrew when the debt level increased to nearly £500 million.

In June 1990, the High Court agreed at the banks' request to the appointment of Ernst & Young as receivers. In six months they agreed eight management buyouts, and sold off two other business, including a sale to Blackburn family-run business, Graham & Brown. 1,500 employees in non-saleable businesses were made redundant, while less than half of the £200 million owed to the banks was recovered; lead lender NatWest took a £25 million loss. Swedish investment companies Mercurius and Proventus, who had each paid £2.3 million for 5 per cent of the group in February 1990, lost their entire investment.
