= Cretonne =

Woven cloth with a dull finish, usually printed in large-scale floral patterns

Cretonne was originally a strong, white fabric with a hempen warp and linen weft.

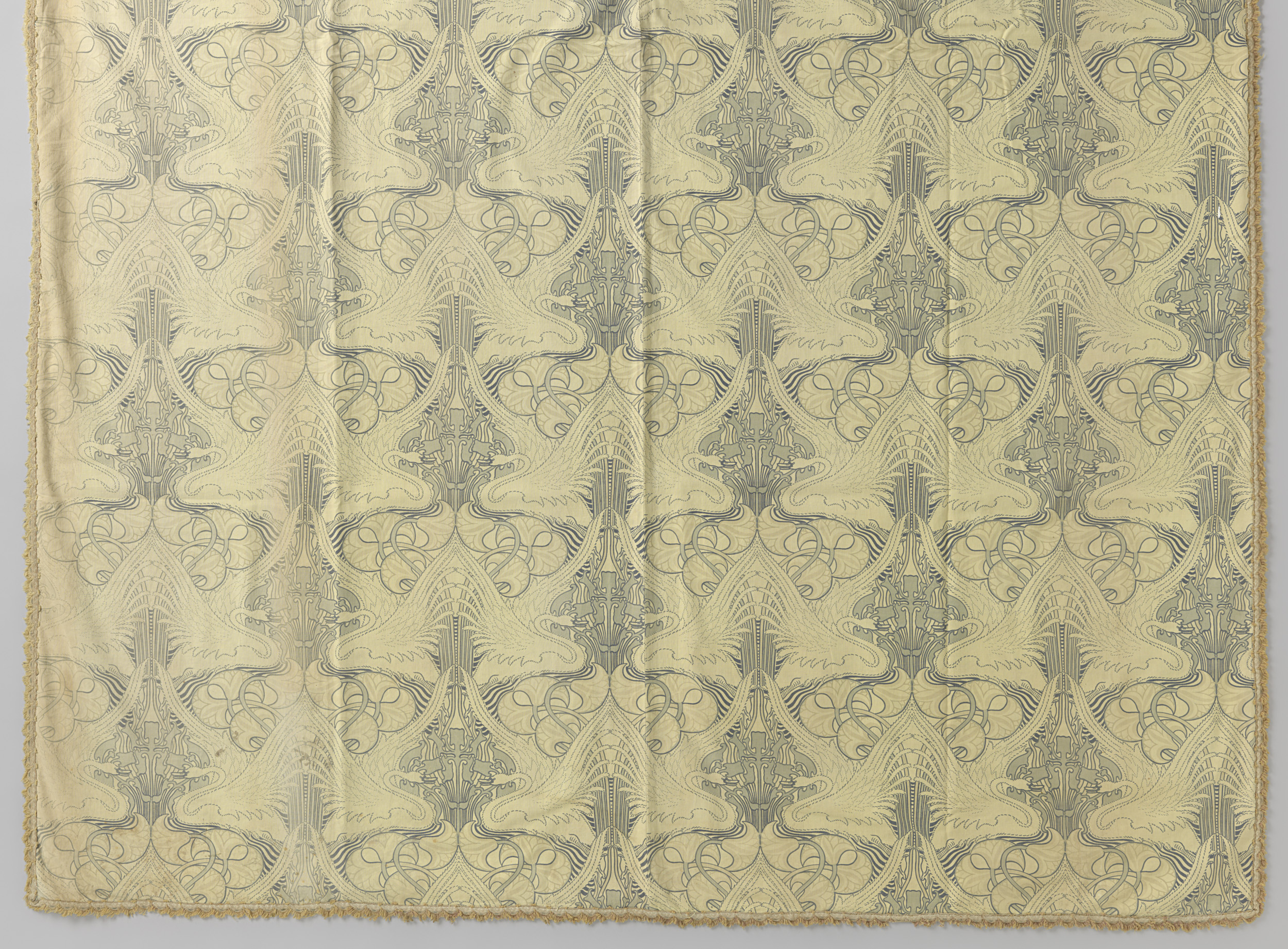
printed cretonne

The word is sometimes said to be derived from Créton, a village in Mesnils-sur-Iton (Eure, Upper Normandy) where the manufacture of linen was carried on; some other serious sources mention that the cretonne was invented by Paul Creton, an inhabitant of Vimoutiers in the Pays d'Auge, Lower Normandy, France, a village very active in the textile industry in the past centuries.

The word is now applied to a strong, printed cotton cloth, which is stouter than chintz but used for very much the same purposes. It is usually unglazed and may be printed on both sides and even with different patterns. Frequently cretonne has a fancy woven pattern of some kind which is modified by the printed design. It is sometimes made with a weft of cotton waste.
