= Chintz =

Calico fabric, usually printed with bright floral designs

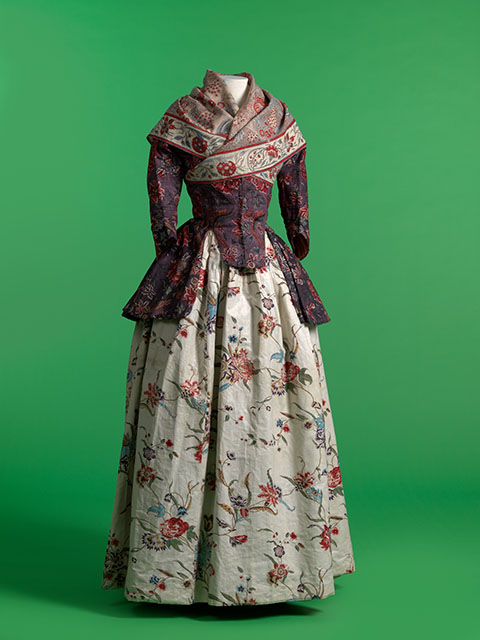
Chintz jacket and neckerchief with glazed printed cotton petticoat. 1770–1800. MoMu, Antwerp.

Chintz (/tʃɪnts/) is a woodblock printed, painted, stained or glazed calico textile that originated in Golconda (present day Hyderabad, India) in the 15th century. The cloth is printed with designs featuring flowers and other patterns in different colours, typically on a light, plain background.

== Name ==
The name is derived from the Hindi: छींट, romanized: chīṁṭ, pronounced [t͜ʃʰĩːʈ], meaning "spotted", "variegated", "speckled", or "sprayed". The Hindi term itself was traditionally thought to derive from the Sanskrit chitra ("variegated"), but recent linguistic research traces its root instead to a non-Aryan word, chitta, meaning "spotted cloth". Since the 19th century, the term has also been used for the style of floral decoration developed in those calico textiles but then used more widely, for example on chintzware pottery and wallpaper. Chintz designs are derived from the style of Indian designs themselves reflecting Mughal art. A white base with floral and animal prints are its basic characteristics.

Unglazed calico was traditionally called "cretonne". The word calico is derived from the name of the Indian city Calicut (Kozhikkode in native Malayalam), to which it had a manufacturing association. In modern English, the words "chintz" and "chintzy" can be used to refer to clothing or furnishings which are regarded as vulgar, suburban, petit-bourgeois, or unfashionable florid in taste, and in informal speech, to refer to cheap, low quality, or gaudy things, and to describe mean or stingy personal behavior.

The term "chintzy" is also attributed to novelist George Eliot, who in 1851 wrote about muslin fabric to her sister, saying: "The quality of the spotted one is best, but the effect is chintzy." This is believed to have been said about cheap British imitations of real chintz, which became common at the time.

== History ==
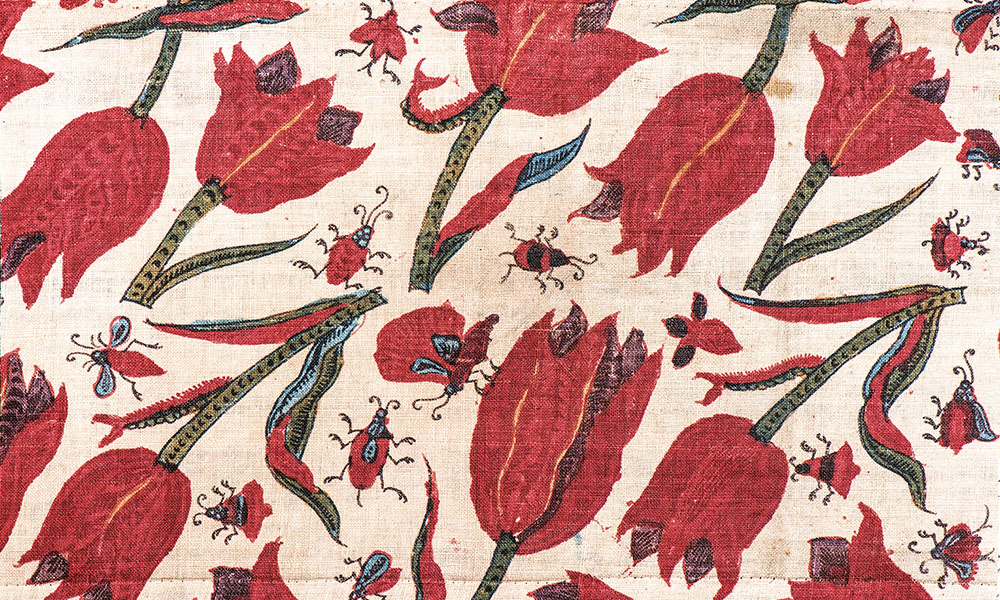
Chintz fragment with tulips and insects (reportedly found in Japan), Coromandel Coast, India, c. 1700–1730

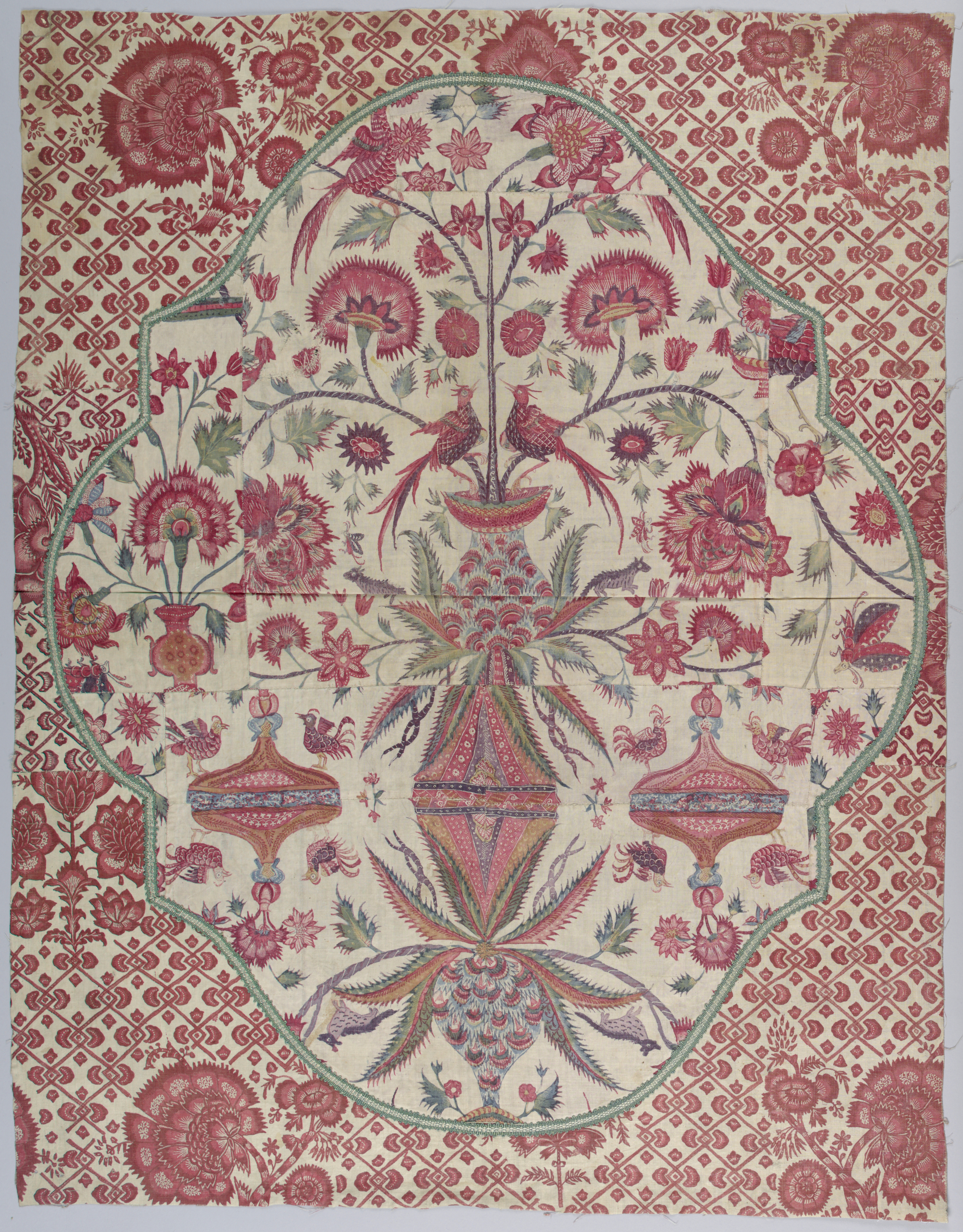
Chintz panel (India), 18th century. Shaped cartouche pieced from a palampore. Background of red and white chintz. Green and white braid applied to outline the edges.

Chintz was originally a woodblock printed, painted or stained calico produced in Hyderabad, India from 1600 to 1800 and popular for bed covers, quilts, and draperies. In the Deccan region, chintz-like painted patterns are featured on the ceiling of the Cine diddi mosque at Bijapur. Chintz designs often featured visual elements borrowed from Persian, Chinese and Turkish traditions. After Vasco da Gama successfully reached Calicut in India in 1498, the fabric became known in Europe. Around 1600, Portuguese and Dutch traders were bringing examples of Indian chintz into Europe on a small scale, but the English and French merchants began sending large quantities. It was significantly shaped by European tastes and imagination to meet the demands of Western market. By 1680 more than a million pieces of chintz were being imported into England per year, and a similar quantity was going to France and the Dutch Republic. These early imports were probably mostly used for curtains, furnishing fabrics, and bed hangings and covers (Samuel Pepys bought a set for his wife.) It has been suggested that wearing them as clothes began when these were replaced and given to maidservants, who made them into dresses, and also that they were first worn as linings.

With imported chintz becoming so popular with Europeans during the late 17th century, French and English mills grew concerned, as they did not know how to make chintz. In 1686 France declared a ban on all chintz imports. In 1720 the Parliament of Great Britain enacted a law that forbade "the Use and Warings in Apparel of imported chintz, and also its use or Wear in or about any Bed, Chair, Cushion or other Household furniture".

Spain followed England and France to ban calico imports. Firstly in 1717 Asian textiles were banned. Then in 1728 the import of European made imitations of Asian textiles was banned in Spain. Additionally the second edict had as one of its objectives to encourage a local, import-substituting weaving and printing industry in imitation of England.

Even though chintz was outlawed, there were loopholes in the legislation. The Court of Versailles was outside the law and fashionable young courtiers continued wearing chintz. In 1734, French naval officer M. de Beaulieu, who was stationed at Pondicherry, India, sent home letters along with actual samples of chintz fabric during each stage of the process to a chemist friend detailing the dyeing process of cotton chintz. His letters and samples can be seen today in the Muséum national d'histoire naturelle in Paris.

In 1742, another Frenchman, Father Gaston-Laurent Coeurdoux, also supplied details of the chintz-making process while he was trying to convert the Indians to Catholicism. In 1759 the ban on chintz was lifted. By this time, French and English mills were able to produce chintz.

Europeans at first produced reproductions of Indian designs and later added original patterns. A well-known make was toile de Jouy, which was manufactured in Jouy-en-Josas, France, between 1700 and 1843. Eventually the word in English came to describe any industrially printed cotton. Modern chintz usually consists of bright overall floral patterns printed on a light background, but there are some popular patterns on black backgrounds as well.

== Books ==
Cloth that Changed the World is a book about chintz by Sarah Fee that explains the story of Indian chintz.

== Gallery ==
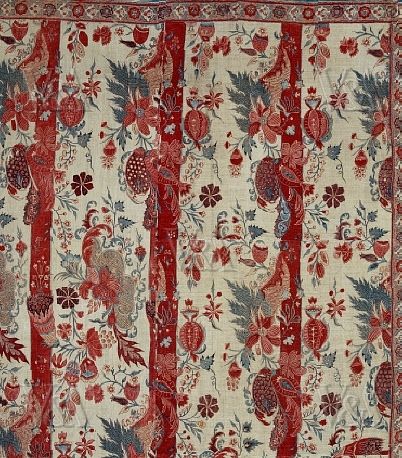
Chintz from the Coromandel Coast, India, c. 1710–1725. Victoria and Albert Museum.

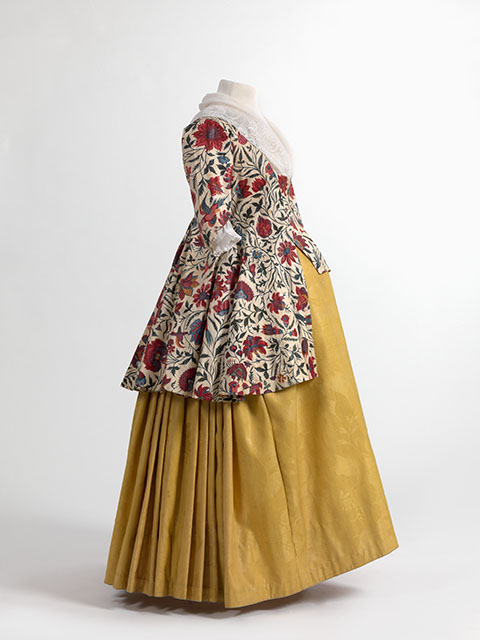
Chintz jacket, 1750–1800. MoMu, Antwerp.

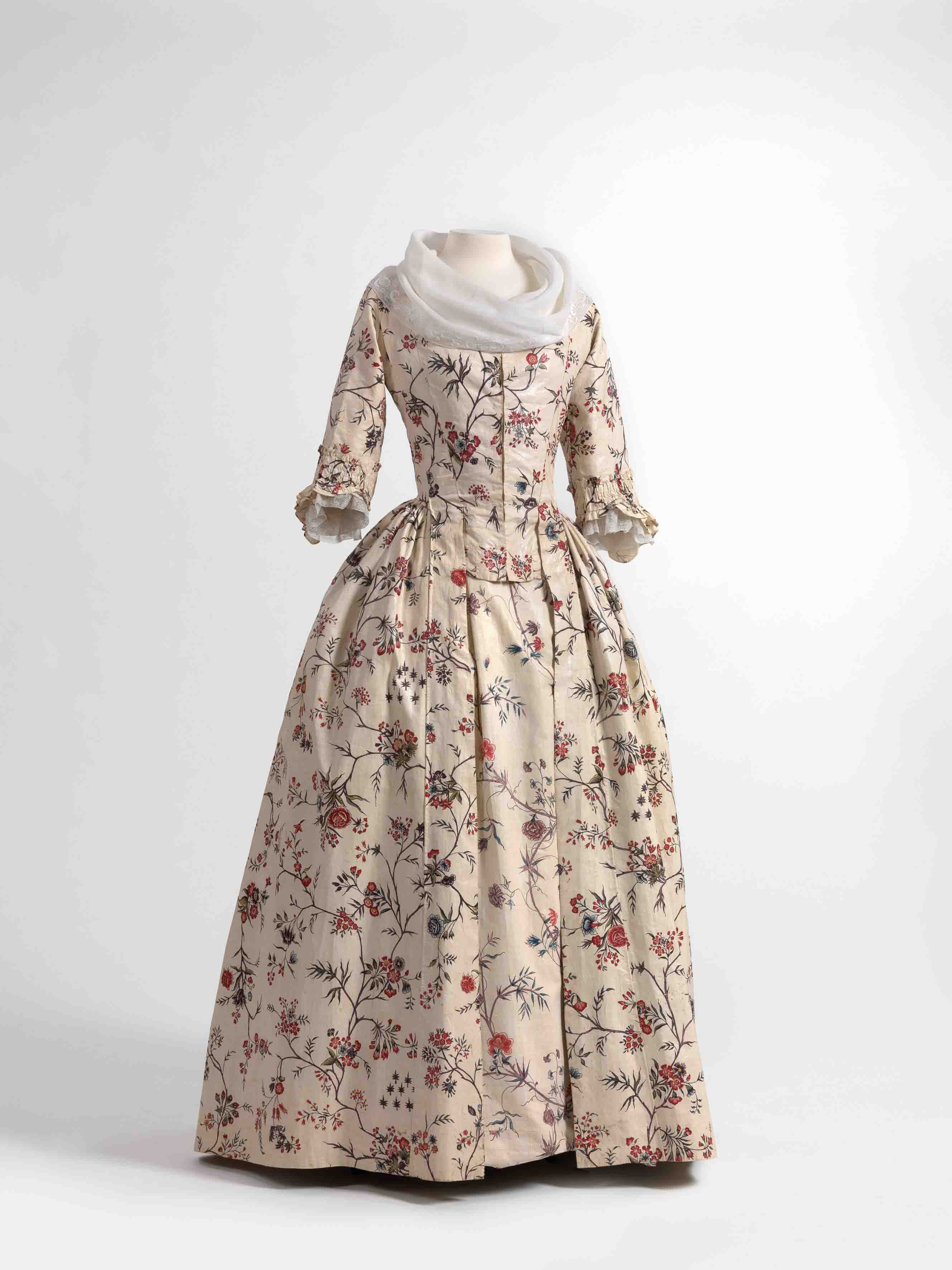
Woman's robe à l'anglaise in chintz, c. 1770–1790. MoMu, Antwerp

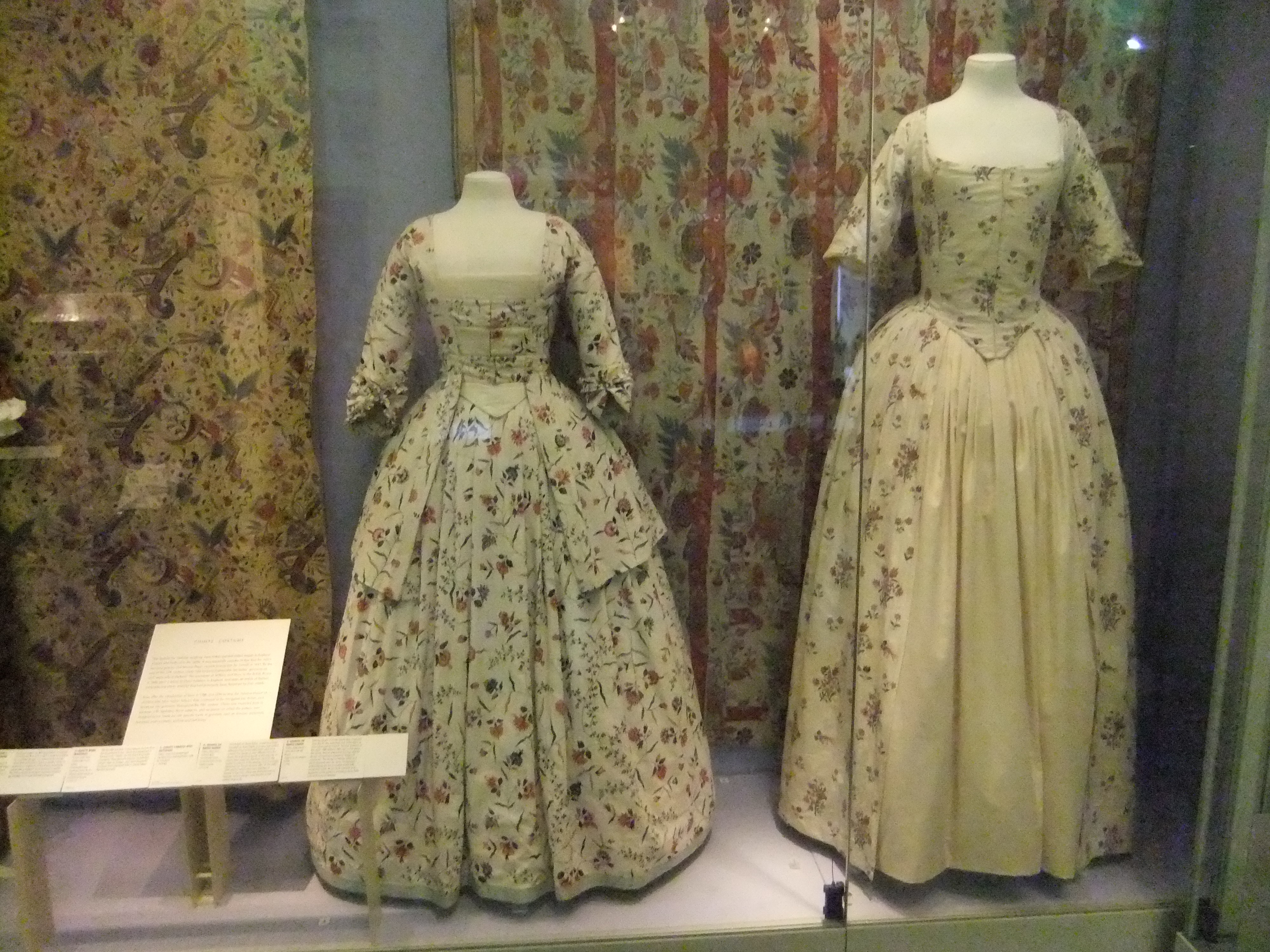
18th-century chintz dresses.

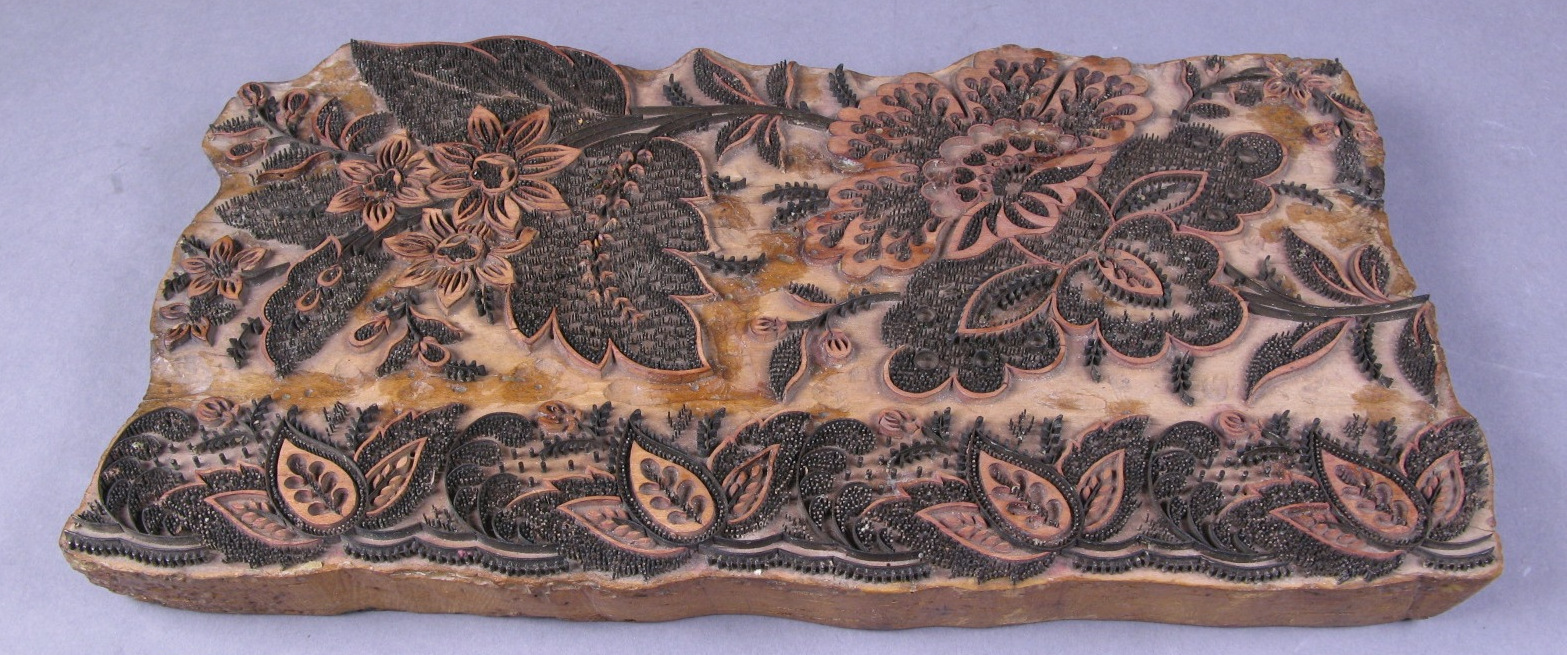
Wooden block for printing chintz, 18 century. Museum of the History of Barcelona.

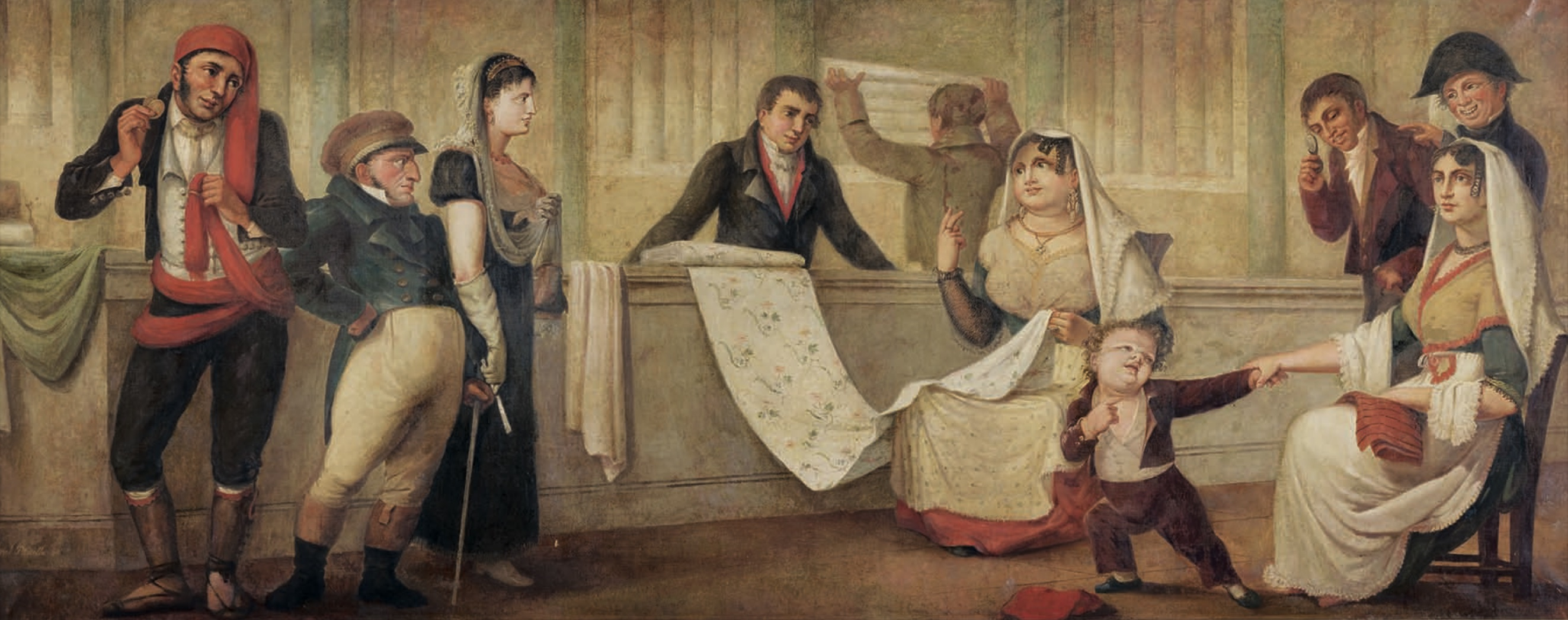
Barcelona chintz shop, c. 1824. Painting attributed to Gabriel Planella i Conxello. Museum of the History of Barcelona.

== See also ==
- Paisley
- Peshgeer
