= Staffordshire Tableware =

Staffordshire Tableware Ltd.
- Headquarters: Stoke-on-Trent, England, United Kingdom
- Parent: Coloroll Group

Staffordshire Tableware Ltd. was a producer of mugs, tableware and dinnerware based in Stoke-on-Trent, England.

It was formerly the ceramics division of the Coloroll Group. Coloroll went into receivership in 1990 and the ceramics division was subject to a management buyout, being renamed Staffordshire Tableware Ltd.

Staffordshire Tableware itself went into receivership on 29 December 2000. Part of the former site is now a B&Q store, with the rest of the land awaiting redevelopment.
