= Dosuti =

Type of cotton cloth

Dosuti (Dosutie, Dusuti, Cotton Dosuti, Dosuti cotton) was one of the coarser cotton piece goods produced in the Indian subcontinent. Originally, it was a handspun and handloom cloth made in the villages. Punjab had various cotton qualities during the 19th century. All were distinguished by their weight, thickness, and the yarn (count and number of yarn used). Dosuti was a cloth made by running two yarns in warp and weft as its name refers to Do(double) Suti (cotton yarns). India's Eastern side was famous for more delicate cotton materials such as Dacca muslins, and Punjab and Gujarat were famous for coarser cotton textile piece goods. Dosuti was a thick cotton material used for rough usages, such as duster. The other contemporary cotton products were Eksuti (made of the single thread), Tinsuti (three threads), and Chausuti (with four threads), etc.

Ded Suti is another variant of Dosuti cotton. Ded means 1.5 consists of two threads (as one) in the warp and a single thread in the weft.

== Production ==
The Punjab region was popular for Dosuti production. Fabrics similar to Dosuti were also weaved in Jail Industries, daily production was estimated 25 feet per person with 28 inches width by using 10.5 yarn count on throw shuttles.

== Use ==
The Dosuti cotton was used for dusters, clothing for poor people, shirts, towels and bedding purposes.

== Present ==
The Dosuti is categorized as a handloom product of the khadi industry and standardized with specific parameters, for instance IS 179: 2009.

== See also ==
- Adhotar
- Bafta cloth
