= Khadi =

Hand-spun cloth from the Indian subcontinent, usually made out of cotton

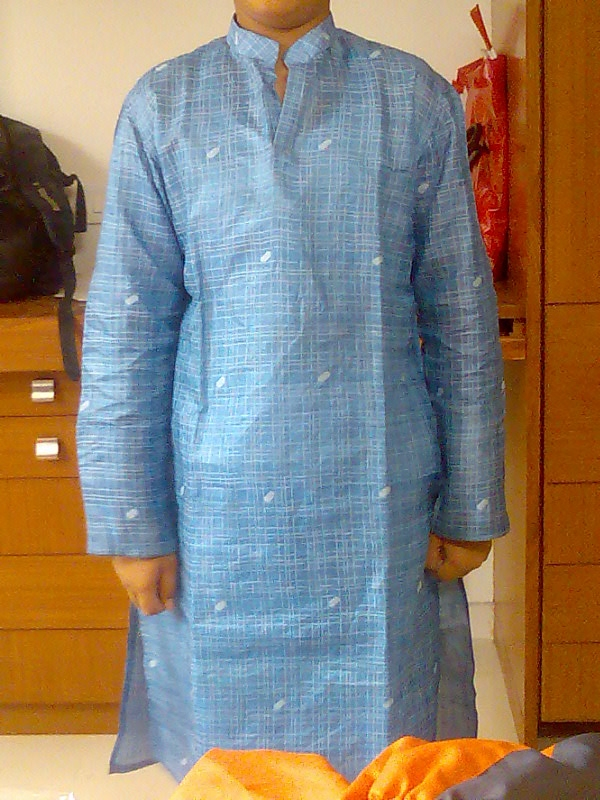
A blue khadi kurta.

Khadi (pronounced [kʰaːdiː], Khādī), derived from khaddar, is a hand-spun and woven natural fibre cloth. It was promoted by Mahatma Gandhi as swadeshi (of homeland) during India's freedom struggle, and the term is used throughout the Indian subcontinent. The first piece of hand-woven cloth was made at the Sabarmati Ashram of Gandhi in 1917–18. The coarseness of the cloth led Gandhi to call it khadi. The cloth is made from cotton, but it may also include silk or wool, which are all spun into yarn on a charkha. It is a versatile fabric that remains cool in summer and warm in winter. To improve its appearance, khadi is sometimes starched to give it a stiffer feel.

== Origin ==
Greco-Roman merchants imported finer cotton in large quantities to the Roman Empire. In medieval times, cotton textiles were imported to Rome through the maritime Silk Road. Arabian-Surat merchants traded cotton textiles to Basra and Baghdad from three areas of Gujarat, the Coromandel Coast, and the east coast of India. To the east, trade reached China via Java. The 14th-century Moroccan traveller Ibn Battuta mentioned Delhi sultan Muhammad bin Tughluq sending five varieties of cloth to the Yuan emperor in China. Some of the textiles are stored in repositories of the Victoria and Albert Museum, London.

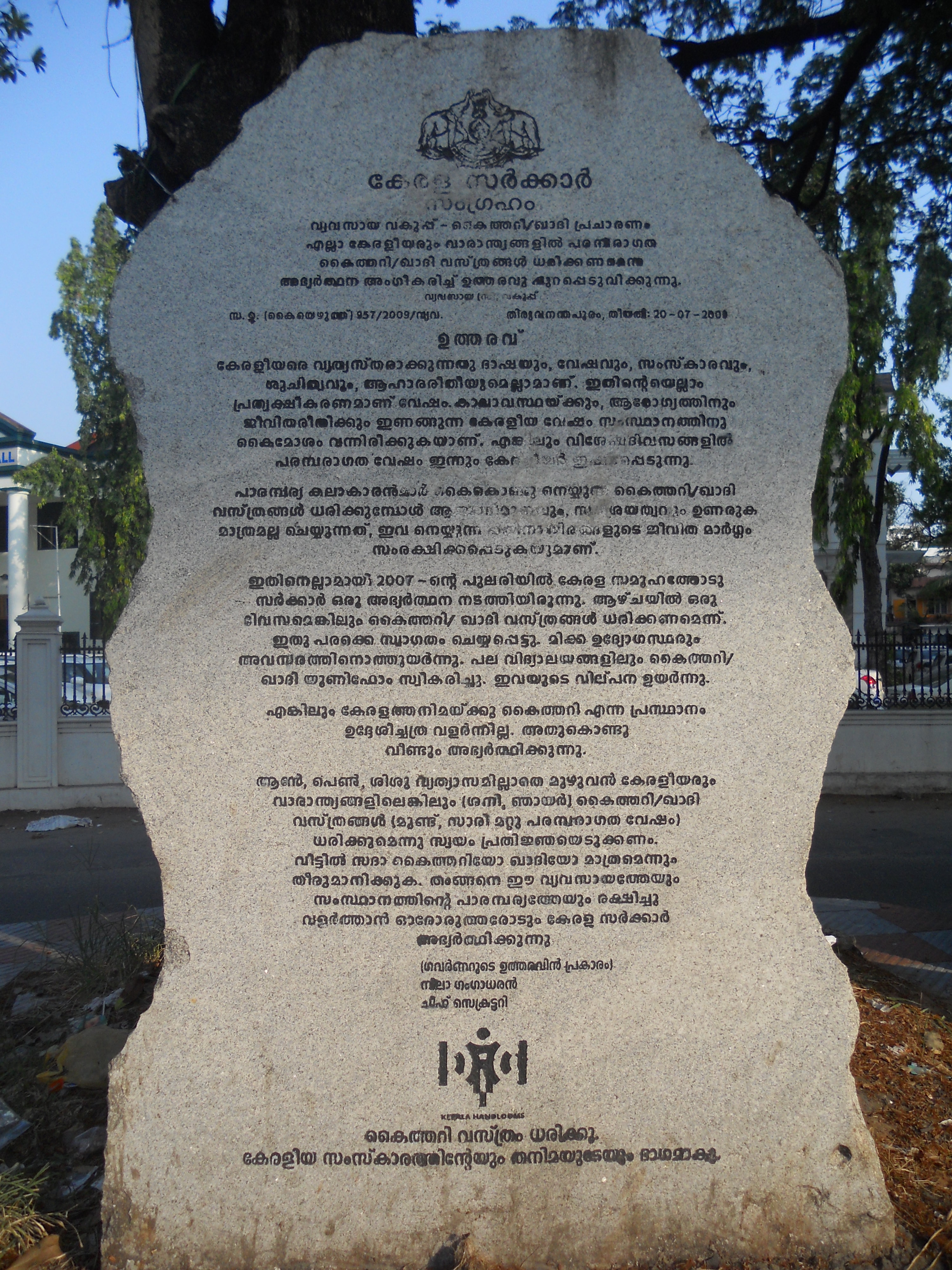
A signage kept at Kochi with an appeal to the citizens to use Khadi/handloom based wear.

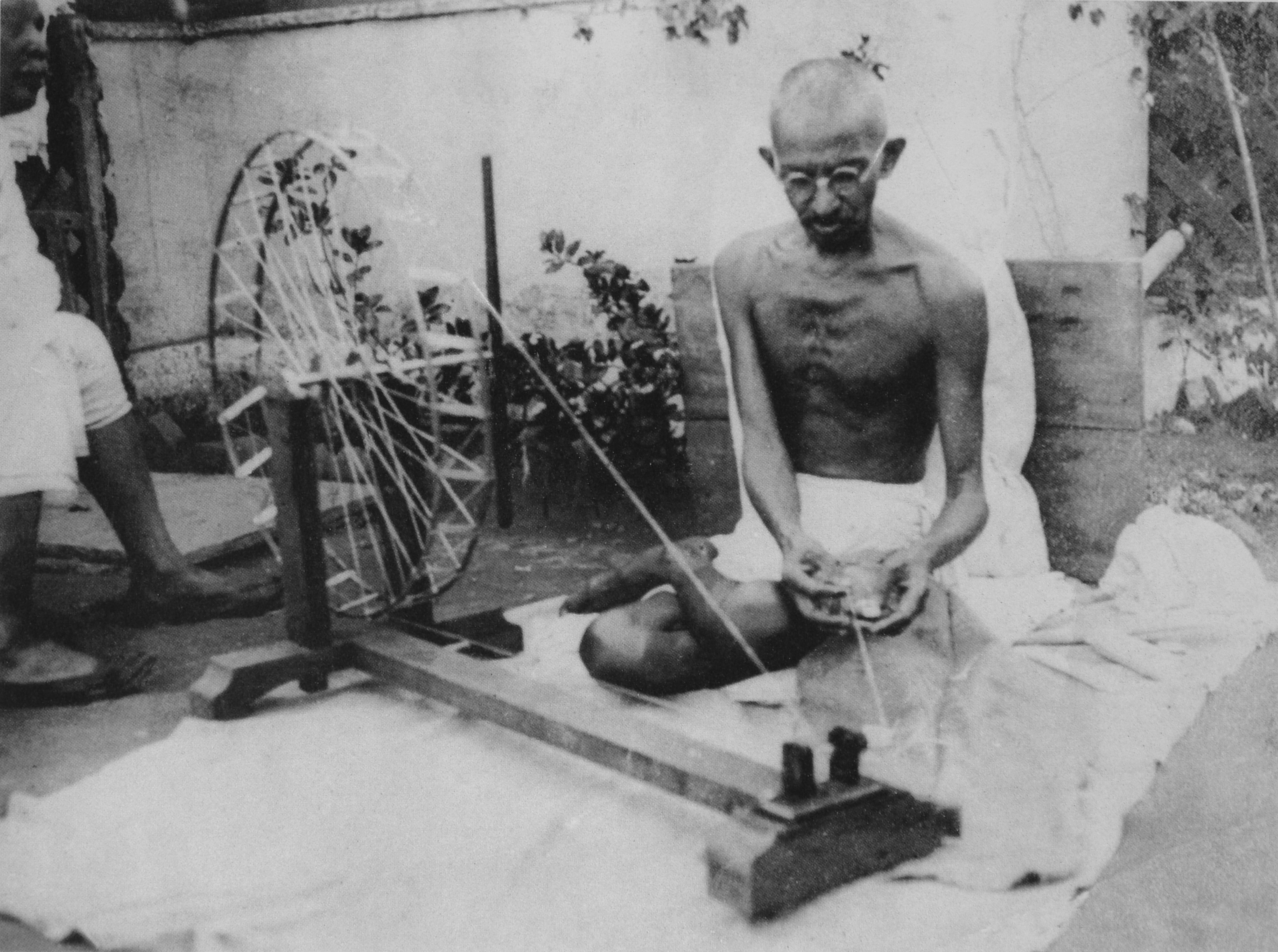
Gandhi spinning

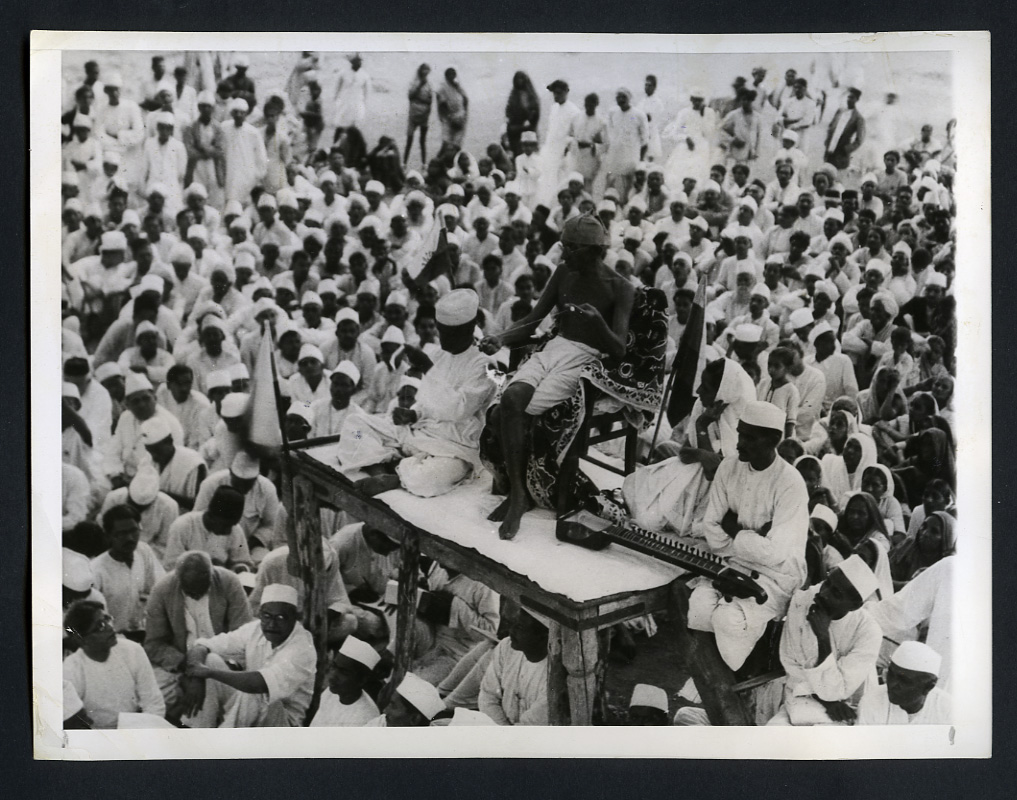
Gandhi spins by hand while addressing his followers

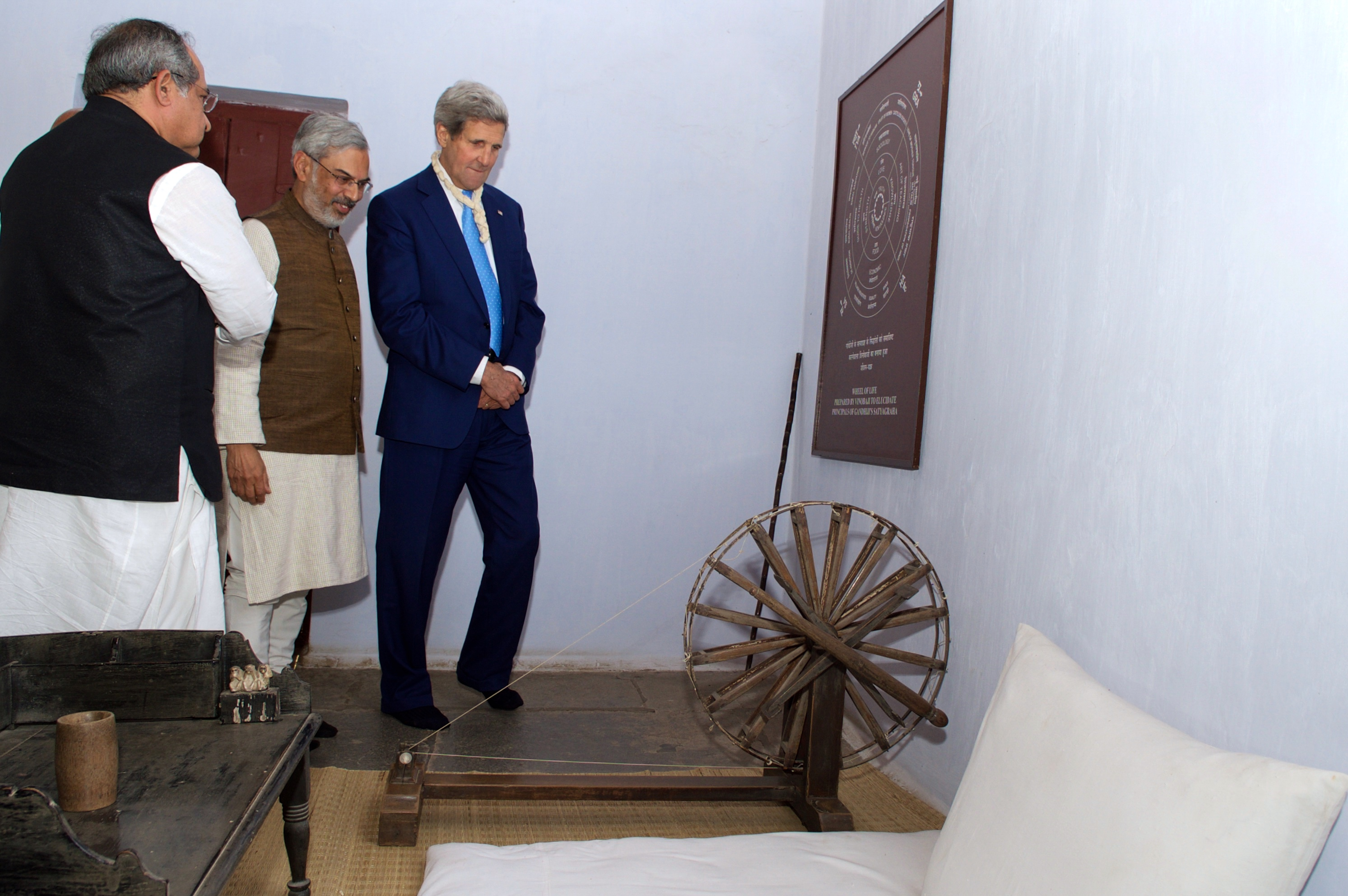
Mohandas Gandhi's bedroom, bed, desk, and spinning wheel in the Sabarmati Ashram

After the First Indian War of Independence in 1857, domestic textile production by mill or traditional methods declined to its lowest levels before khadi emerged as a "silent economic revolution" as an outcome of a long and laborious evolutionary process.

The American Civil War (1861–1865) caused a raw cotton crisis in Cottonopolis Britain. Substitute Indian cotton at was sourced at cheap prices as the British sought to supplement raw materials to Manchester-Lancashire area textile mills. During Victorian era (1837–1901), 47 mills existed in the 1870s but Indians still bought clothes at an artificially inflated price, since the colonial government exported the raw materials for cloth to British fabric mills, then re-imported the finished cloth to India. In the Edwardian era (1901–1914) the Swadeshi movement of boycotting foreign cloth remained prominent. During the first two decades of the 20th century it was backed by nationalist politicians and Indian mill owners.

In 1922, Mahatma Gandhi requested the Indian National Congress (INC) to start a khadi department. In 1924, due to a large amount of work, a semi-independent body All India Khadi Board (AIKB) was formed which liaisoned with the INC's khadi department at the provincial and district levels. During his tenure as President of the Indian National Congress from December 1924 to April 1925, Mahatma Gandhi organized the first Swadeshi Exhibition with Khadi and Village Industries (Gramodyog) exhibits at the Belgaum Congress Session from 26 to 27 December 1924. The exhibition featured khadi, spinning wheels, and village crafts, highlighting the vision of economic self-reliance. It formed a key part of Gandhi’s constructive programme against British colonial rule. In 1925, the All India Spinner Association (AISA) was formed comprising the khadi department and AIKB. Mahatma Gandhi was the founder of AISA. He made it obligatory for all members of the INC to spin cotton themselves and pay their dues in yarn. Gandhi collected large sums of money to create grassroots-level khadi institutions to encourage spinning and weaving which were certified by AISA. Handspun yarn was expensive and of poor quality, and weavers preferred yarn produced by mills because it was more robust and consistent in quality. Gandhi argued that the mill owners would deny handloom weavers an opportunity to buy yarn because they would prefer to create a monopoly for their own cloth. When some people complained about the costliness of khadi to Gandhi, he only wore dhoti, though he used wool shawls when it got cold. Some were able to make a reasonable living by using high-quality mill yarn and catering to the luxury market. Gandhi tried to put an end to this practice by threatening to give up khadi altogether, but since the weavers would have starved if they listened to him, they ignored the threat. In 1919, Gandhi started spinning at Mani Bhawan Mumbai and encouraging others to do so. He invented Patti Charkha, using a double-wheel design to increase speed and control while reducing size. In 1946, when huge funds were being spent on development for more productive charkhas, he recommended takli over charkha.

The khadi movement began in 1918 and was marked with its own changing dynamics. Initially, a clear emphasis could be seen on using khadi as an economic solution due to stagnation, from 1934 onwards the fabric became something that villagers could use for themselves.

In 1921, Gandhi went to Chandina Upazila in Comilla, Bangladesh, to inspire local weavers and consequently in the greater Comilla region, weaving centres were developed in Mainamati, Muradnagar, Gauripur and Chandina.

== In post-independence India ==
In 1948, India recognized the role of rural cottage industries in its Industrial Policy Resolution. In 1948, Shri Ekambernathan invented amber charkha. The All India Khadi & Village Industries Board (AIKVIB) was set up in January 1953 by the Government of India. In 1955 it was decided that a statutory body, the Khadi and Village Industries Commission (KVIC), should replace the Board and the KVIC Act was passed in 1956, which brought the KVIC into existence as a statutory organisation the following year.
After Independence, the government reserved some types of textile production, such as towel manufacturing for the handloom sector, which resulted in a deskilling of traditional weavers and a boost for the power loom sector. Private sector enterprises have been able to make handloom weaving somewhat remunerative and the government also continues to promote the use of Khadi through various initiatives.

Prime Minister Narendra Modi during Khadi Utsav (27 Aug 2022), said "Khadi was ignored after Independence due to which weavers in the country suffered" and asserted that khadi is a movement to help the poor, and further claimed that the KVIC is a statutory organisation engaged in promoting and developing khadi and village industries.

== Muslin (khadi) in Bangladesh ==
The Pakistan government saw khadi as emblematic of the ideology of Congress that had led the non-cooperation movement, so khadi organisations like the Noakhali Ambika Kalinganga Charitable (NAKC) Trust, established during Gandhi's visit in 1946, were discouraged. Pakistan prime minister Firoz Khan Noon (1957–58), who served as Governor of East Pakistan from 1950 to 1953, was liberal towards khadi and established The Khadi and Cottage Industry Association in 1952. Sheikh Mujibur Rahman's historic 7 March speech of Bangabandhu refuelled the momentum to produce khadi. A sudden wave of demand persisted in Bangladesh for many years after the country's independence from Pakistan in 1971. In 1975, some years after the independence of Bangladesh, the NAKC trust was reformed and renamed the Gandhi Ashram Trust.

Muslin was registered under Bangladesh as its geographical indication in 2020.

The soft or refined khadi is known as muslin khadi. Researchers have tried to replicate muslin and identified phuti carpas as the variety from the DNA of cotton and from motifs used in making muslin sarees from Victoria & Albert Museum London of 1710 collection with 350 muslin sarees.

== Trademark ==
The KVIC holds the exclusive rights to use the trademarks khadi and Khadi India. The National Internet Exchange of India Domain Dispute Policy Arbitration Tribunal in New Delhi rejected a private entity's claim that khadi is a generic word. In 2017, KVIC and the government of India fought a case at the EUIPO against a German company that had trademarked the word. While KVIC obtained the latest trademark registration in Bhutan on 9 July 2021; trademark registration was granted in UAE on 28 June 2021, and the organisation registered the trademark in Mexico in December 2020.

== Legacy ==
The KVIC enrolled 2624 functional Khadi institutions in India where decentralized units of Kshetriya Shri Gandhi Ashram in Uttar Pradesh and Uttarakhand, Zila Khadi Gramodyog Sangh in Bihar and Jharkhand, Sarvodaya Sangh in Tamilnadu have survived as the oldest operational Khadi organisations.

== See also ==
- Dosuti
- Gaji
