= Longcloth =

Soft, plain-woven, bleached cotton fabric

Longcloth (or long cloth) refers to a plain cotton cloth originally made in comparatively long pieces.

The name was applied particularly to cloth made in India. The long cloth made at Coromandel Coast was of the length of 37 yards. Longcloth, which is now commonly bleached, includes several various qualities. It is heavier than cambric, and finer than medium or Mexican. In the early 1900s, as it was used principally for underclothing and shirts, most of the longcloth sold in Great Britain passed through the shirt and underclothing manufacturers' hands who sold it to the shopkeepers. However, there was still considerable if decreasing retail trade-in piece-goods. In the UK in the early 20th century, the lower kinds of longcloth, which were made from American cotton, corresponded in quality to the better kinds of shirting made for the East, but the best longcloths were made from Egyptian cotton and were fine and fairly costly goods.

Nowadays, longcloth designates a cotton fabric which is of high quality, very soft, coarsely woven, and very often used to make underwear, loincloths and infants' clothing.

== Ghati ==
Ghati was a cloth with a highly glazed surface, refined in texture and strong in strength. It was a particular type of cotton fabric. It was a premium quality long cloth and hence expensive too. Ghati was a lighter ( in texture) than the Sussi. The material was affordable to wealthy persons only, also called ''ghatti''. Rahon, a town in the district Jalandhar of Punjab, India, had an excellent reputation for this variety. Its production ceased by the close of the nineteenth century.

=== Patterns and use ===
Before English clothes emerged in Punjab, Ghati was used for sheets, shirts, pajamas and angarkha. Then Ghati was available in plain white and also in various patterns of damascene, flowered and ''Chashma-e-Bulbul'' meaning "Nightingale's eye"

== Latha ==
Longcloth was also termed as Latha or Lattha Latha was preferred for Kashmiri artwork, i.e., Amli work with silk threads. Latha was also used in certain dresses.

== Pauni ==
Pauni was another coarse variety of cotton cloth from the Punjab region. It was one-third of the length of the Longcloth.

== See also ==
- Calico
- Bafta cloth
- Gazzi cloth
- Piece goods
