= Bafta cloth =

Type of textile

Bafta (baft, baftae, bath, bufta or bafetta) is a kind of calico, initially made in India.

== Characteristics ==
Bafta is a coarse, cheap woven material made in long, narrow pieces, chiefly of cotton. It has a closed plain weave structure, and has been made in many varieties, from coarse to fine, and made from cotton only or with silk added. It was an affordable, comfortable material with draping qualities suitable for various dresses. Bafta was a generic term for plain calico from Gujarat.

== Etymology ==
The name bafta was derived from the Persian word bafta, meaning "woven, wrought".

== History ==
Bafta was originally produced in Bharuch, a city previously known as Broach, in Gujarat, India. The old Bharuch baftas seems to have been a fine stuff. Bharuch was a major textile manufacturing hub from 1500 to 1700, known for producing bafta for the West and Southeast Asian markets. Bafta was among the leading textile products exported to Europe from Western India for printing in the 18th century. The city's location near to the port of Surat and close to the banks of the Narmada River helped Bharuch to exploit its potential.

Bafta was a mid-price dress fabric during the early 17th century. Where wealthy women used to wear expensive clothes made of silk, fine cotton and muslin, working-class women wore clothes made of coarser cotton fabrics, such as bafta, dyed in different colors. Off-white cloth was known as malti, mansuri, or kham, and white cotton cloth was known as "baft".

Jean-Baptiste Tavernier (1605–1689), traveler and French pioneer of trade with India, described "Broach Baftas" in his account of his travels to India.

In this place are made a great quantity of Baffas, or long and large pieces of cotton. These cottons are very fair, and close woven; and the price of these pieces is from four to an hundred roupies. You must pay custom at Baroche for all goods that are brought in and carried out.

— Tavernier, Jean-Baptiste., Travels in India

Bengal's description of piece goods for the Cape market includes different variations of Bafta such as "Chittabully Baftaes, and Callapatty Baftaes".

== See also ==
- Dosuti
- Dorea (cloth)
- Gurrah (cloth)
- Khasa (cloth)
