= Khasa (cloth) =

Type of textile

Khasa (Cossa, Cossaes) was a high-quality variety of calico cloth that was manufactured and used for clothing in the Mughal Empire.

== Name ==
Khasa or khāṣṣa means special. Khasa was termed "kashak" in the Ain-i-Akbari, and was also known as 'jangal klasa' for its fine close weave. Khasa is one of seven cotton cloths named in the Ain-i-Akbari.

== Features ==
Khasa was a cotton fabric softer than longcloth and more closely woven than muslin. It is described as having been soft and closely woven, with a fine texture. In the 16th-century emperor Akbar's time, khasa was considered to be one of the best and most expensive types of cotton cloth. It was commonly used for turbans in the Mughal era.

=== Dimensions ===
Khasa, like other piece goods, were produced with specific dimensions; regular khasas were having dimensions of 20 × 1 or 1.5 yards. The number of threads was in warp direction were 1400–2800 with the weight of 595 grams /pc (with 2800 threads).

== Production centers ==
Khasa made in Sonargaon was considered to be of particularly high quality. It was also produced in Dacca, Malda, Santipore and Cossimbazar. "Rahon Khasa" was cloth produced at the town of Rahon in Punjab.

== Exports ==
Thomas Bowrey, an English merchant and mariner in the East Indies trade in the late 17th century, described khasa as a kind of muslin that was the cloth most commonly exported from Dhaka.
