= Negro cloth =

Coarse, strong, and inexpensive cloth used for slaves' clothing

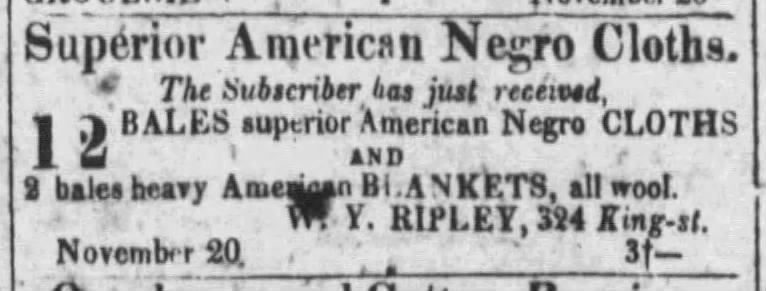
"Superior American Negro Cloths" advertised in a Charleston, South Carolina newspaper in 1826

Negro cloth or Lowell cloth was a coarse and strong cloth used for slaves' clothing in the West Indies and the Southern Colonies. The cloth was imported from Europe (primarily Wales) in the 18th and 19th centuries.

The name Lowell cloth came from the town Lowell in Massachusetts, United States, where the cloth was produced.

== The Act of 1735 ==
South Carolina's Negro Act of 1735 had various cheap materials dictated for slave clothes that include ''Negro cloth, duffelds, course kiersies, osnaburg, blue linen, checked linen, coarse calicoes and checked kinds of cotton''.

== Types ==
Negro cloth was a woven material made of cotton or blended coarse threads also homespun. These were inexpensive and lower grades of cloth. Certain long cloths of coarser varieties and Salampore were among recognized Indian materials; the Dutch merchants called them ''Guinea or Negro cloth.'' ''Guinea cloth'' was a generic term for various inferior Indian piece goods traded for the purpose, such as inexpensive dyed plain and patterned calicoes like stripes and checks.

== Quality ==
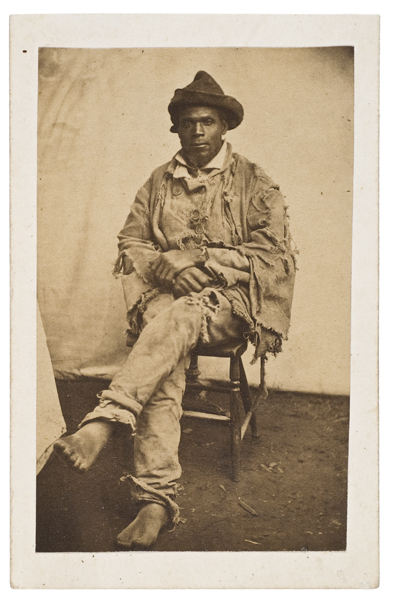
Gordon, an enslaved man in Negro cloth clothing, 1863, Baton Rouge

Negro cloth was durable, but often regarded by its wearers as coarse, rough, and uncomfortable. Those freed from slavery recalled the cloth feeling akin to "needles sticking one all the time." Antebellum Mississippi planters bought from cloth vendors offering materials "were uniformly utilitarian, never mentioning color, decoration, or anything new or unique. Such advertisements simply offered shoes and hats and cloth without description [that] combined durability with low cost...In choosing cloth or clothing, slaveowners showed interest exclusively in price and durability. A south Mississippi planter ordered for his slaves winter clothes 'of a material that I trust will last better than the goods sent last winter.'"

== Garments ==
The cloth was converted into various garments, such as breeches, jackets, skirts, bodices, shirts and trousers.

== See also ==
- History of slavery in Virginia
- Osnaburg
- Perpetuana
- Tapsel (cloth)
