= Bayadere =

Bayadere may refer to:

- Bayadere is a European term for devadasi — a female dancer in India, often clothed in loose Eastern costume
- Bayadere (fabric), an Indian silk fabric
- Die Bajadere (operetta), an operetta by Emmerich Kalman
- Die Bajadere (polka), a polka by Johann Strauss II
- La Bayadère, a ballet by Marius Petipa to the music of Ludwig Minkus
- Les bayadères, an opera by Charles-Simon Catel

== See also ==
- Nautch
