= Mercia (disambiguation) =

Mercia was an Anglo-Saxon kingdom covering the region now known as the English Midlands. It is sometimes used as a poetic name for the Midlands.

Mercia or Mercian may also refer to:

- Mercia Inshore Search and Rescue, an volunteer water-rescue organisation
- Mercia MacDermott (born 1927), writer and historian
- Mercian Brigade, a historic unit in the British Army
- Mercian Cycles, a bicycle manufacturer
- Mercian dialect, a dialect of Old English spoken in Anglo-Saxon Mercia
- Mercian Regiment, a present-day unit of the British Army
- Mercian Corporation, a producer and distributor of retail wine products
- Hits Radio Coventry & Warwickshire, previously called Mercia

== See also ==
- List of monarchs of Mercia
- Royal Mercian and Lancastrian Yeomanry
- West Mercia Police
