= Osnaburg (disambiguation) =

Osnaburg is a type of fabric. "Osnaburg" can also refer to the following places:

- Osnaburg, an archaic English name for the city of Osnabrück in Lower Saxony, Germany, for which the fabric is named.
- Osnaburg Township, Stark County, Ohio, a township near Canton, Ohio, in the United States
- Mehetia, island in French Polynesia, formerly known as Osnaburg Island

Osnaburgh can refer to:

- Dairsie, also called Osnaburgh, a village in Fife, Scotland
- Osnaburgh First Nation, the former name of the Mishkeegogamang First Nation in the Kenora District, Ontario, Canada
  - Osnaburgh House, the house for which the first nation was named
  - Osnaburgh, Ontario and New Osnaburgh, settlements of the First Nation
