= Sussi (cloth) =

Striped cloth

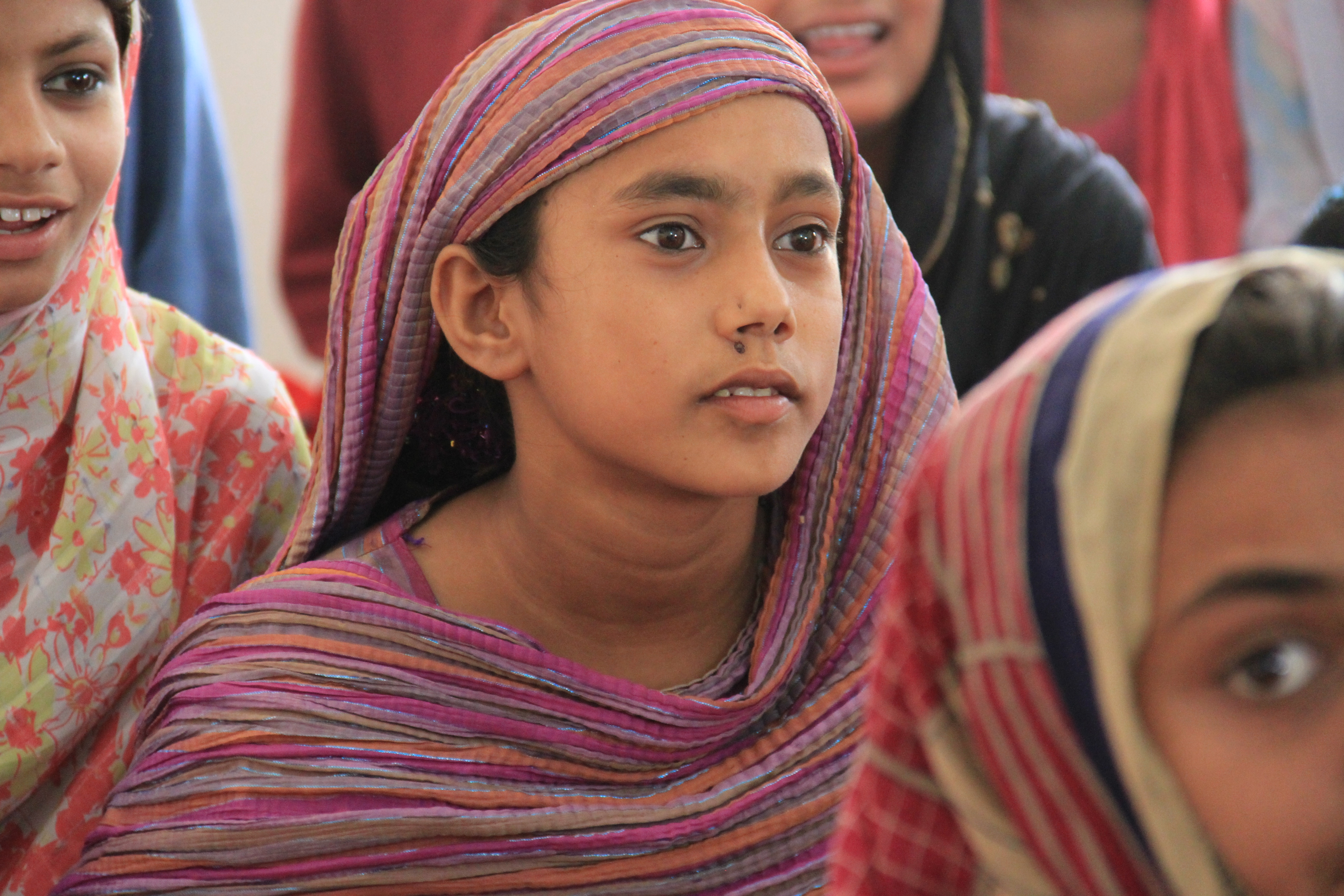
A girl wearing Sossi fabric dress in Sindh.

Sussi or susi (Soosey, Sousae) is a term for multicolored striped or checked cloth produced mainly in Sindh and in some parts of Punjab. Sussi is thin handloom fabric made of cotton, silk, or a blend of the two, with colored warp stripes. Sindh region was known for its production and exports during the Mughal period. Sussi was most often made with red and blue, blue and white, or green and white stripes, but other patterns were also produced. The fabric was exported to England, where sousaes were in great demand in the 18th century.

== Name ==
Sussi was the umbrella term used for all striped fabrics.

== Texture ==
Sussi is a plain fabric with warp vertical stripes. Sussi is produced with cotton, with silk, or with blended cotton and silk.

== Dimensions ==
The fabric was 10 to 20 yards long and one yard in width.

== Sussi Types and Production ==
Sussi along with other cotton varieties is produced at Hala, Nasarpur, Hyderabad, Thatta, Hoshiarpur, Gurdaspur, Lahore, Multan, Amritsar, Ludhiana, Jhang, Shahpur, Jalandhar, Delhi, Gurgaon, Rohtak, Karnal, Rewari, Panipat Salari was a type of handloom-produced sussi made at Kalabagh in Mianwali District, Pakistan.

== Use ==
The cloth was used to make lowers such as pajamas and salwars (loose trousers). Blended sussi was used for pajamas and petticoats.

== See also ==
- Bayadere (fabric)
- Gingham
- Madras (cloth)
- Salu (cloth)
- Tartan
- Tapsel (cloth)
