= The Devil's Cloth =

Book by French historian Michel Pastoureau

- First English edition
- Author: Michel Pastoureau
- Original title: L'étoffe du diable : une histoire des rayures et des tissus rayés.
- Translator: Jody Gladding
- Language: French
- Publication date: April 1991

The Devil's Cloth is a book by Michel Pastoureau. The book was originally published in French in April 1991, under the title L'étoffe du diable : une histoire des rayures et des tissus rayés. The English edition, translated by Jody Gladding, was published in July 2001. It is about the cultural biases surrounding striped patterns, and the cultural history of these patterns, in Western culture.

The Devil's Cloth begins with a medieval scandal. When the first Carmelites arrived in France from the Holy Land, the religious order required its members to wear striped habits, prompting turmoil and denunciations in the West that lasted fifty years until the order was forced to accept a quiet, solid color. The medieval eye found any surface in which a background could not be distinguished from a foreground disturbing. Thus striped clothing was relegated to those on the margins or outside the social order—jugglers and prostitutes, for example—and in medieval paintings the devil himself is often depicted wearing stripes.

— Michel Pastoureau, The Devil's cloth, Angeline Goreau, The New York Times Book Review
