= Bayadere (fabric) =

Indian silk fabric with a horizontal stripe pattern

Bayadere was an Indian silk fabric with a horizontal stripe pattern.

== Etymology ==
In Europe the term bayadere (from French: bayadère, from Portuguese: balhadeira, literally dancer) was occasionally used.

== Structure and pattern ==
Bayadere was made using both plain and twill weaves. The fabric was either woven with weft stripes or printed. The stripes were made with bright and strongly contrasting colors. Moire bayadere is a bayadere with a wavy pattern.

== See also ==
- Sussi (cloth)
