= Lasonic =

Consumer electronics product model

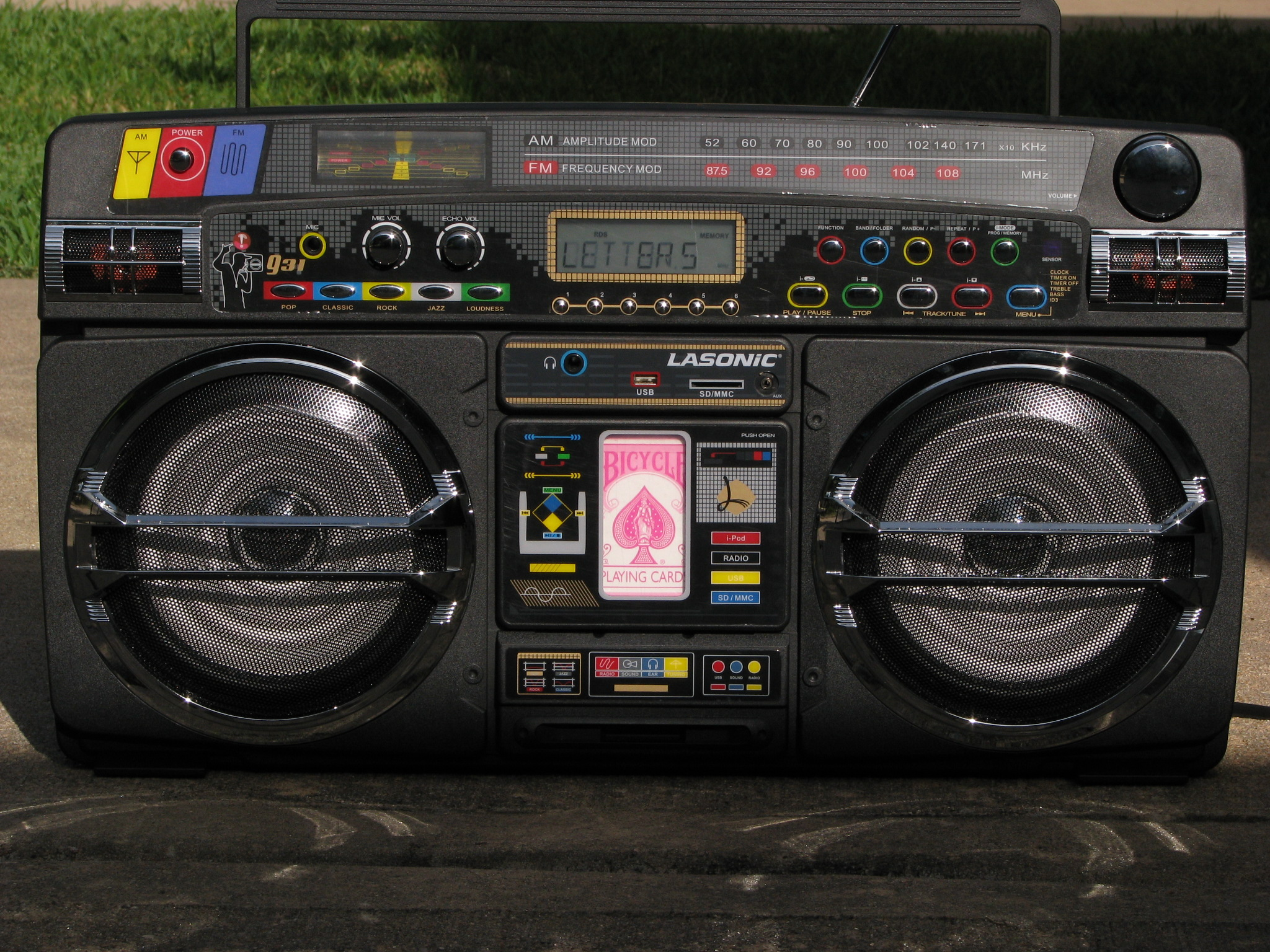
LASONiC i931 iPod Ghetto Blaster (c.2008)

Lasonic is a product model and former trademark of consumer electronics, including boom boxes made from the mid-1980s to mid-1990s by Yung Fu Electrical Appliances based in Tainan City, Taiwan. Other products include DVD home theater systems, television sets, DVD players, CD and cassette players, FM radios, speakers, external media storage devices, and more (MP3/MP4 players, digital photo frames).

Yung Fu Technology Electrical Corporation exports products to Lasonic Electronics Corporation which started its portable audio business in 1978 (and when the "LASONiC" trademark was renewed and re-renewed in 2011).

== Boombox models ==
- TRC-905
- TRC-908, 909S, 910B, 911
- TRC-918
- TRC-920, 1985
- TRC-922, 1985 (or 1984)
- TRC-926
- TRC-928
- TRC-931, 1985 (or 1986)
- TRC-935, 1985
- L-30, 1985
- L-30K, 1985
- MacDaddy
- Jumbo TRC-951
- Jumbo TRC-975, 1988
- TRC-931 [Retro 1], 1995
- i931, 2008 - iPod, reads USB thumbdrives and flash memory
- i931X (black, white, red), i931X Gold
- i931bt, 2011 redesigned in 2012 Bluetooth streaming model of the i931

In 2008, the Lasonic Electronics Corporation of Irwindale, California, USA released the i931. In 2011, fashion designer Paul Smith redesigned the i931 giving it a white look with multicolor look. In 2013, Lasonic released a limited edition with Mishka NYC, designed by the famous Artist "L'Amour Supreme".

The TRC-931 is featured in The Lonely Island's "Boombox" 2010 music video.

The TRC-931 is featured in "Clerks II".

The TRC-931 is featured in Cher Lloyd's "Swagger Jagger"

The TRC-931 is featured in Sugar Ray's "When It's Over"

The TRC-931 is featured in Sam And The Womp's "Bom Bom"

The TRC-931 is featured in Korn's "Got the Life" 1998 music video.

The TRC-931 is featured in FatBoy Slim's "Going Out Of My Head" 1997 music video.

The TRC-931 is featured in FatBoy Slim's "Ya Mama" 2001 music video.

The TRC-975 is featured in At The Drive-in's music video for "Metronome Arthritis"
