= Tapsel (cloth) =

18th-century striped cloth from India

Tapsel (Tapsels, Tapseel, Topseile, Taffechella, Tafficila) was a coarse cotton and silk cloth. It was a woven variety with a striped pattern, and usually a blue color. The fabric dated back to the 18th century and was made in western India.

== See also ==
- Sussi (cloth)
