= Mercian dialect =

Dialect of Old English

- Native to: England
- Region: Midlands
- Ethnicity: Anglo-Saxons
- Language family: Indo-European: Germanic; West Germanic; North Sea Germanic; Anglo-Frisian; Anglic; Anglian; Mercian dialect
- Early forms: Proto-Indo-European: Proto-Germanic

Language codes
- ISO 639-3: –

Mercian was a dialect spoken in the Anglian kingdom of Mercia (roughly speaking the Midlands of England, an area in which four kingdoms had been united under one monarchy). Together with Northumbrian, it was one of the two Anglian dialects. The other two dialects of Old English were Kentish and West Saxon. Each of those dialects was associated with an independent kingdom on the island. Of these, all of Northumbria and most of Mercia were overrun by the Vikings during the 9th century. Part of Mercia and all of Kent were successfully defended but were then integrated into the Kingdom of Wessex. Because of the centralisation of power and the Viking invasions, there is little to no salvaged written evidence for the development of non-Wessex dialects after Alfred the Great's unification, until the Middle English period.

== History ==
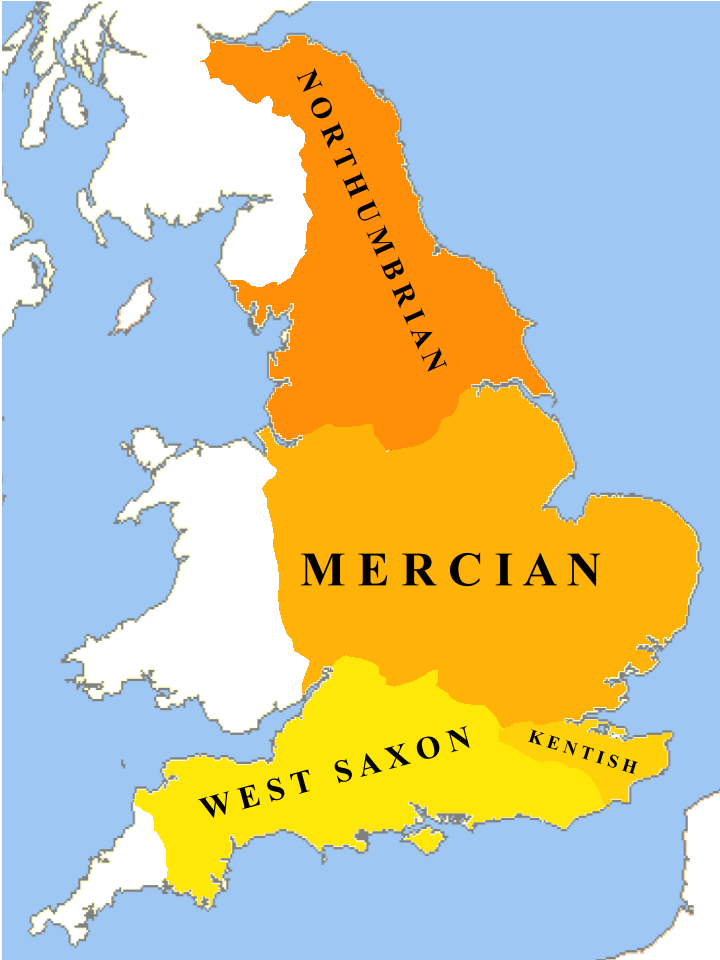
The dialects of Old English c. 800 CE

The Mercian dialect was spoken as far east as the border of the Kingdom of East Anglia and as far west as Offa's Dyke, bordering Wales. It was spoken in an area that extended as far north as Staffordshire, bordering Northumbria, and as far south as South Oxfordshire/ Gloucestershire, where it bordered on the Kingdom of Wessex. The Old Norse language also filtered in on a few occasions after the foundation of the Danelaw. This describes the situation before the unification of Mercia.

The Old English Martyrology is a collection of over 230 hagiographies, probably compiled in Mercia, or by someone who wrote in the Mercian dialect of Old English, in the second half of the 9th century. Six Mercian hymns are included in the Anglo-Saxon glosses to the Vespasian Psalter; they include the Benedictus and the Magnificat.

In later Anglo-Saxon England, the dialect remained in use in speech but rarely in written documents. Some time after the Norman conquest of England, Middle English dialects emerged and were later found in such works as the Ormulum and the writings of the Gawain poet. In the later Middle Ages, a Mercian or East Midland dialect seems to have predominated in the London area, producing such forms as are (from Mercian arun).

Mercian was used by the writer and philologist J. R. R. Tolkien to signify his fictional Rohirric language.

== Alphabet ==
Modern Old English orthography adds additional diacritics above certain letters to show specific phonological features. These distinctions largely were not shown in Old English. Such diacritics include macrons for vowel length and overdots for palatalization. Sound approximations from various European languages have been given, but it is best to learn by the International Phonetic Alphabet transcriptions for more precise pronunciation.

- a for /ɑ/; General American English cot
- ā for /ɑː/; Norwegian ta
- b for /b/; English boy
- c for /k/; English cold
- ċ for /tʃ/; English cheese
- d for /d/; English did
- e for /e/; Spanish me
- ē for /eː/; German See
- f for /f/; English fun; realised as [v] between voiced sounds (English thrive)
- g for /g/; realised as [ɣ] (Dutch getrouw)
- ġ for /j/; English yes
- ġġ or ċġ for /dʒ/; English wedge
- h for /h/; realised as [h] (English hunt) syllable-initially, as [x] after back vowels (German Nacht), and as [ç] after front vowels (German Sicht); h also represented devoicing before certain voiced consonants
- i for /i/; Spanish mí
- ī for /iː/; English three
- k for /k/; English kind; k was used rarely
- l for /l/; English light
- m for /m/; English mom
- n for /n/; English nine; realized as [ŋ] before c or g (English think)
- o for /o/; Spanish yo
- ō for /oː/; German froh
- p for /p/; English pip
- r for /r/; likely [r] (a "rolled" r), which is present in Scottish English
- s for /s/; English sit; voiced to [z] when between voiced sounds (English wise)
- sċ for /ʃ/; English ship
- t for /t/; English tart
- u for /u/; Spanish tú
- ū for /u/; German Hut
- x for /ks/; English fox
- y for /y/; equivalent to /i/ with rounded lips; Finnish mykkä
- ȳ for /yː/; equivalent to /iː/ with rounded lips; German früh
- ƿ for /w/; often replaced by modern w; English win
- ð for /θ/, which realised as [θ] (English think) or [ð] (English feather) depending upon position; interchangeable with þ
- þ for /θ/, which realised as [θ] (English think) or [ð] (English feather) depending upon position; interchangeable with ð
- æ for /æ/; English bat
- ǣ for /æː/; Finnish ääni
- œ for /ø/; Hungarian jövő
- œ̄ for /øː/; German schön or Hungarian jövő

== Grammar ==
Mercian grammar has the same structure as other West Germanic dialects.

=== Nouns ===
Nouns have three genders: masculine, feminine, neuter; and four cases: nominative, accusative, dative and genitive. These, in addition, all have singular and plural forms. They can also be strong or weak.

==== Examples ====
- Strong masculine noun stān (stone)
  - nominative (singular, plural): stān, stānes
  - accusative: stān, stānes
  - dative: stāne, stānen
  - genitive: stānes, stāne
- Weak masculine noun name (name)
  - nominative: name, namen
  - accusative: namen/name, namen
  - dative: namen/name, namen
  - genitive: namen/name. namene/namen

=== Pronouns ===
Personal pronouns (I/me, you, he, she, we, you (pl.) and they) come in all the above cases and come in three numbers: singular, dual ('you/we two'), plural.

Demonstrative pronouns vary in the same way described below for the indefinite article, based on 'ðes' only for this. That and Those are the same as the definite article.

Relative pronouns (who, which, that) are usually 'ðe' and 'ðet.'

=== Articles ===
The definite article is equally complex, with all genders changing in the singular in all cases, based on variations of 'ðe.' In the plural all genders take the same word. The indefinite article was often omitted in Mercian.

=== Adjectives ===
Adjectives are always declined, even with some verbs (which means they can double up as adverbs), e.g. I am cold. Having split into weak and strong declensions (depending on the strength of the noun), these split again into all four cases, both singular and plural.

Comparative adjectives (e.g. bigger) always add 're.' Example: Æðelen (noble), æðelenre (nobler).

=== Verbs ===
Verbs can be conjugated from the infinitive into the present tense, the past singular, the past plural and the past participle. There exist strong and weak verbs in Mercian that too conjugate in their own ways. The future tense requires an auxiliary verb, like will (Mercian wyllen). There are three moods: indicative, subjunctive and imperative. Like most inflected languages, Mercian has a few irregular verbs (such as 'to be' bēon and 'have' habben). For basic understanding, the four principal parts must be known for each strong verb: weak verbs are easier and more numerous, they all form the past participle with -ed.

=== Vocabulary ===
Mercian vocabulary is largely inherited from Proto-Germanic, with Latin loanwords coming via the use of Latin as the language of the Early Church, and Norse loanwords that arrived as part of the Norse incursions and foundation of the Danelaw which covered much of the midlands and north of England.

Some morphological differences between the Mercian and West Saxon include:

- Change of West Saxon final -c to -h, presumably alluding to its ultimate loss in Modern English.

Ic (I) ↔ Ih

- The preservation of -k in Proto-Germanic in some pronouns, like mec (me).

== See also ==
- AB language (a written Middle English dialect)
- Mercia (disambiguation)
- Wiktionary's coverage of Mercian terms
