= Stripe (pattern) =

Long and narrow band of color, often in alternating sets

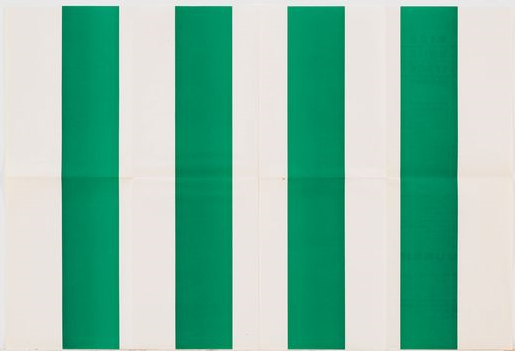
Untitled artwork by Daniel Buren

A stripe is a line or band that differs in color or tone from an adjacent area. Stripes are a group of such lines in a repeating pattern of similar regions.

== History ==
The early history of stripes in fashion is unclear. However, in medieval Europe, a stigma existed against wearing striped clothing. During the 13th century, Carmelites monks are thought to have worn brown and white stripes. For more than 25 years, the monks resisted orders from eleven successive popes to give up their cloaks, only succumbing to Pope Boniface VIII's ban of striped clothing from all religious orders.

The stigma of wearing stripes persisted as late as the 18th century, being associated with Europe's “outcast” population, such as prostitutes, clowns, hangmen, heretics, and lepers. Beginning in the 19th century, Europe began to embrace the Neo-classical style.

In the United States during this time, the stripe's stigma was well entrenched. This led to prisoners wearing a Prison uniform of black and white stripes for both humiliation and to discourage escape attempts. This practice continued until the early 20th century, when striped uniforms were slowly phased out by the United States.

Stripes entered mainstream western fashion in the roaring twenties, particularly in men's clothing like the pinstripe Suit. Stripes frequently appeared as part of school uniforms as well, first at public schools, then at universities. Fashion designer Coco Chanel incorporated stripes in her designs, having been inspired by the Marinière worn by French seamen.

== Usage and appearance ==
As a pattern (more than one stripe together), stripes are commonly seen in nature, food, emblems, clothing, and elsewhere.

Two-toned stripes inherently draw one's attention, and as such are used to signal hazards. They are used in road signs, barricade tape, and thresholds.

In nature, as with the zebra, stripes may have developed through natural selection to produce motion dazzle.

Stripes may give appeal to certain sweets like the candy cane.

For hundreds of years, stripes have been used in clothing. Striped clothing has frequently had negative symbolism in Western cultures. Historian Michel Pastoureau explores the cultural history of these design decisions in the book, The Devil's Cloth.

== Gallery ==
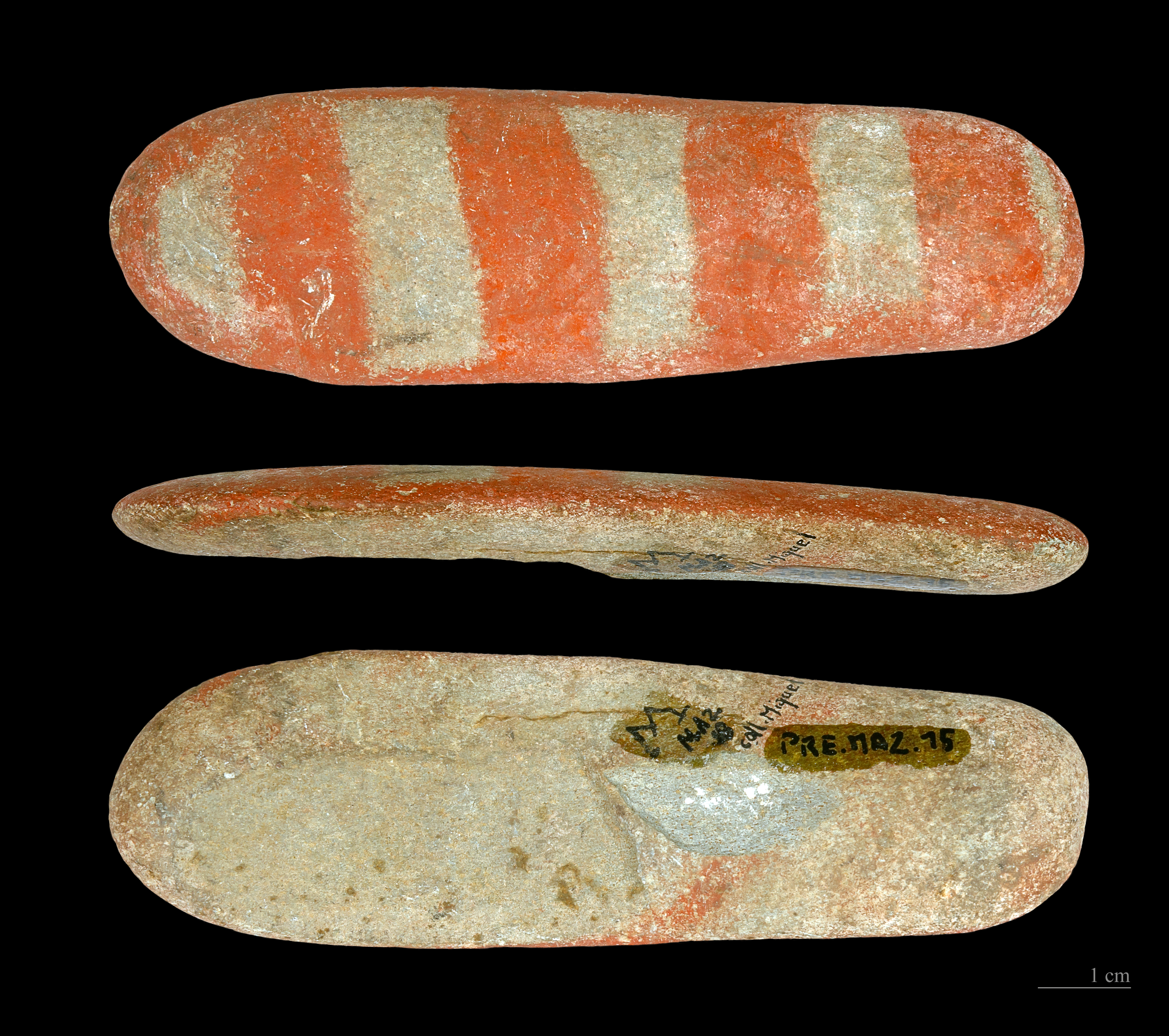
Striped Azilian painted pebble from le Mas-d'Azil, Ariège, France (12,500–10,000 BP)

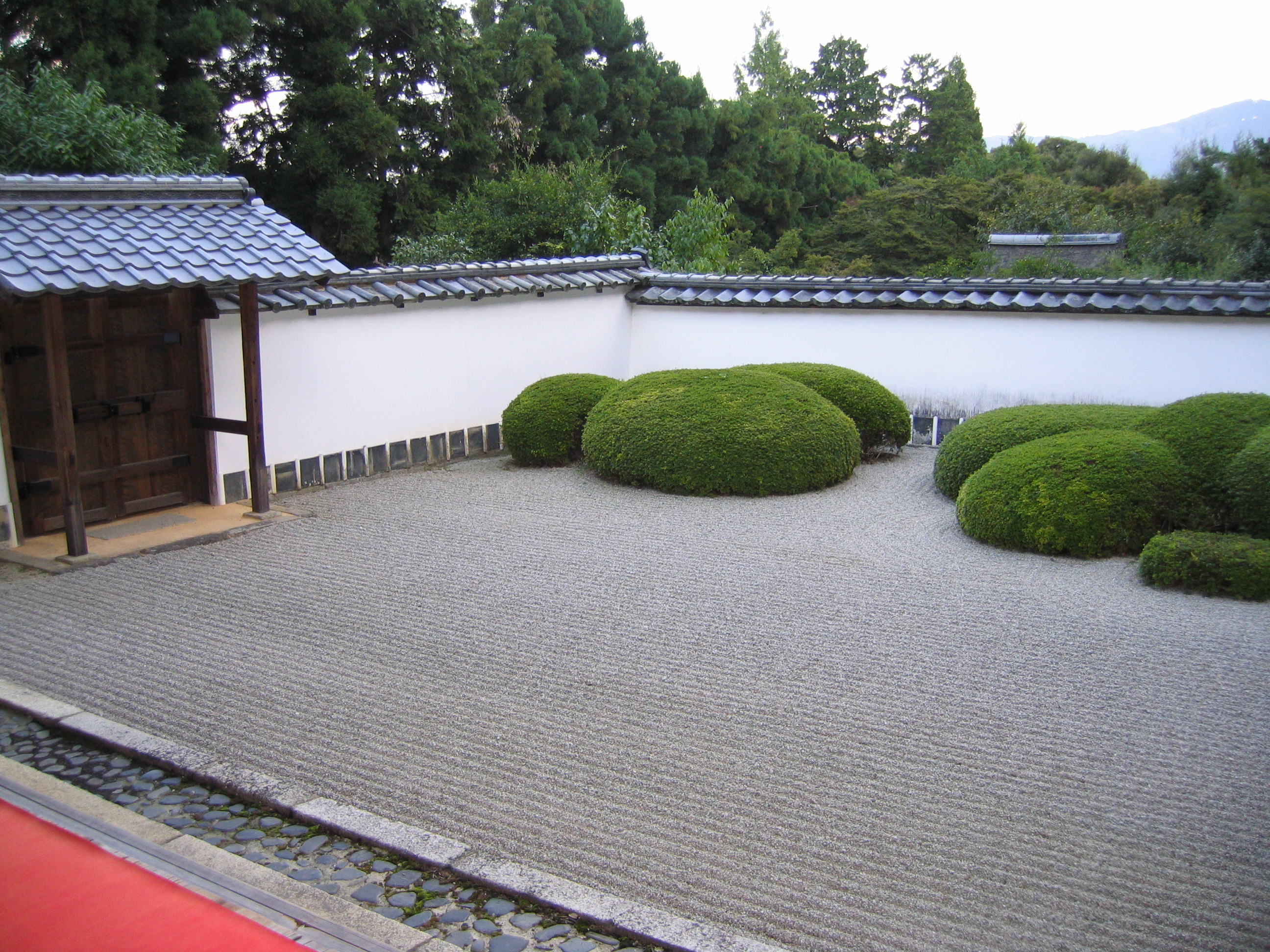
Dry garden showing raked gravel stripes, Shōden-ji Temple, Kyoto

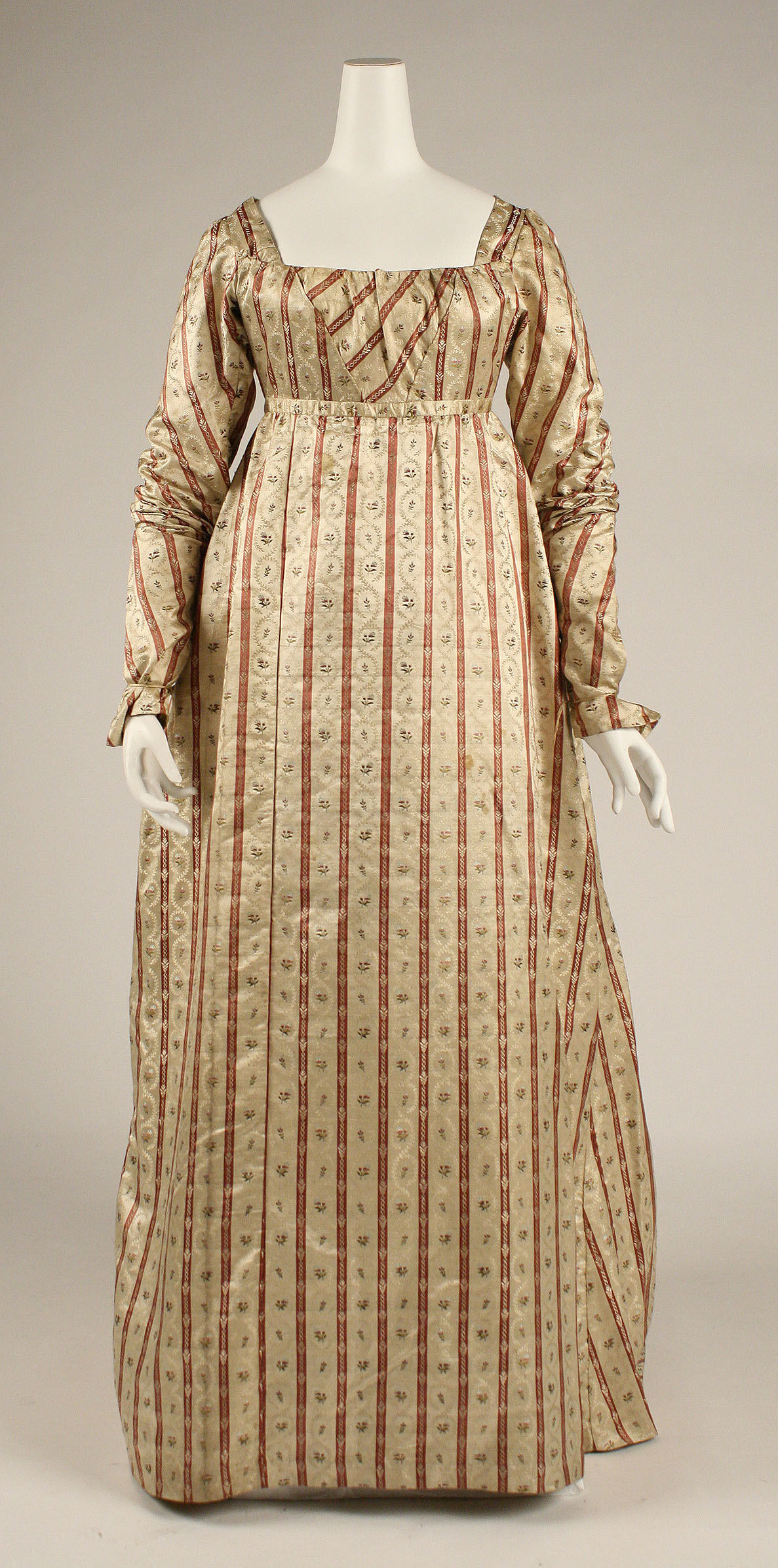
Striped blouse from 1800's

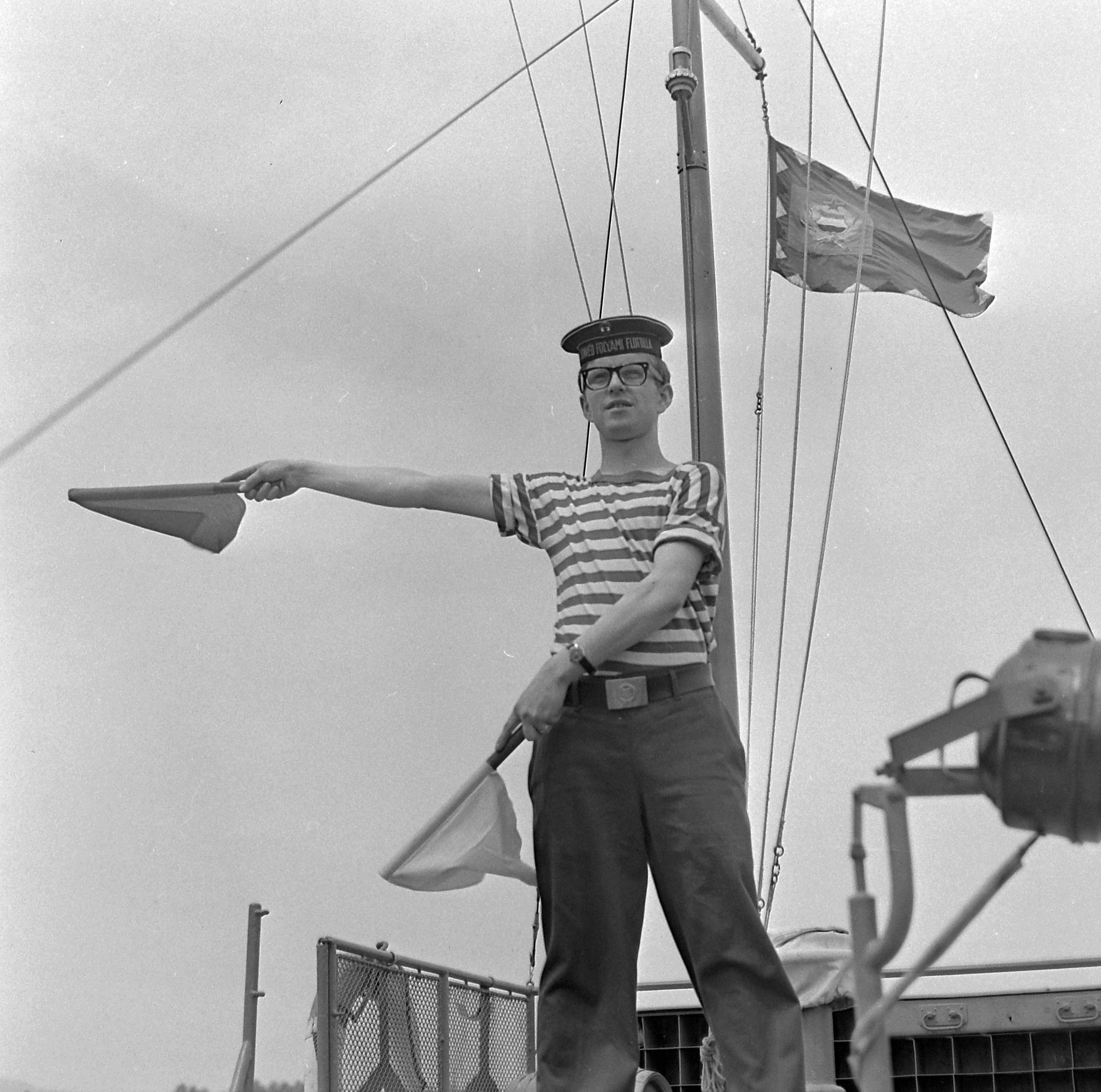
French Navy sailor wearing classic marinière shirt which inspire Coco Chanel of the stripe design

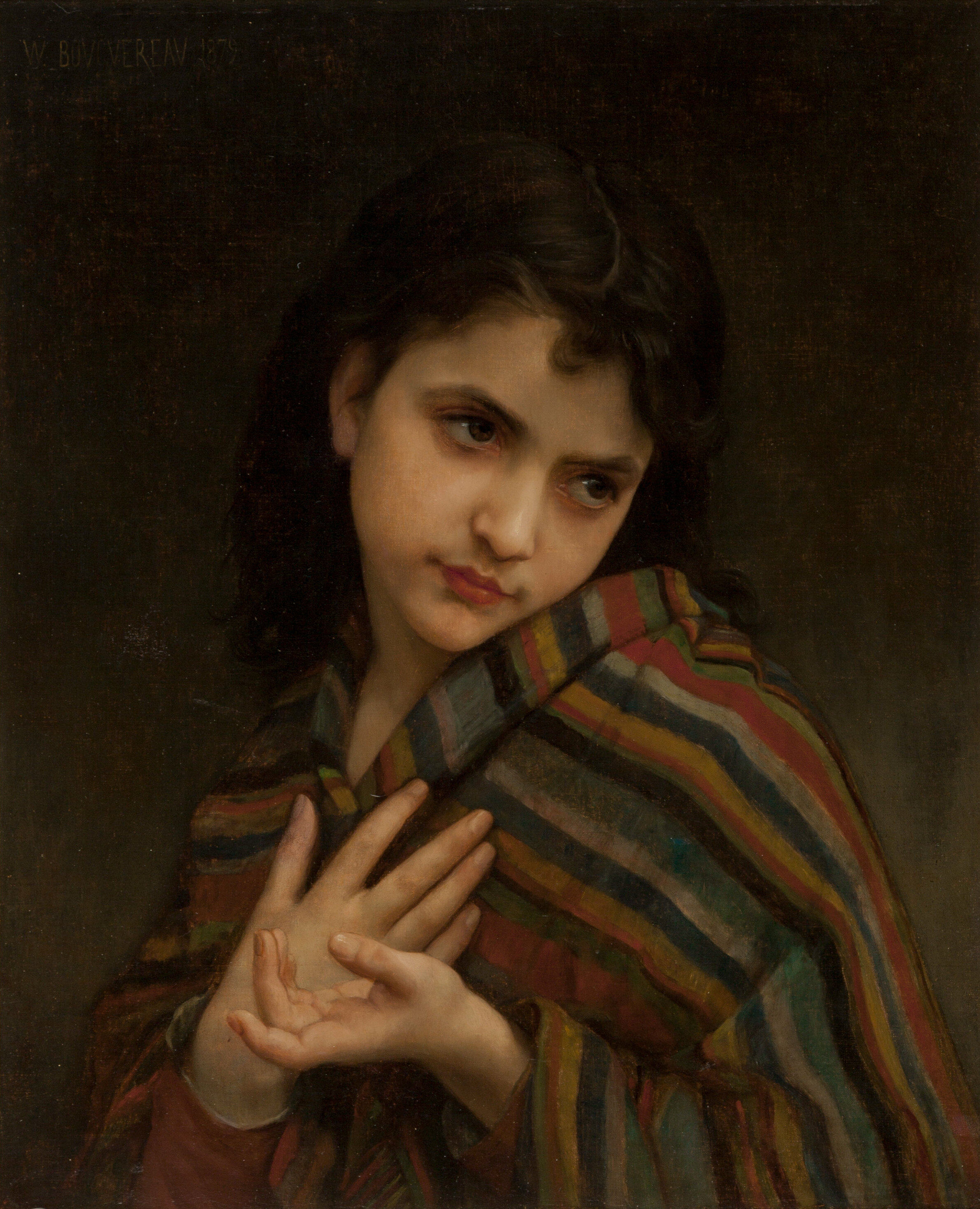
Painting of woman wearing striped clothing

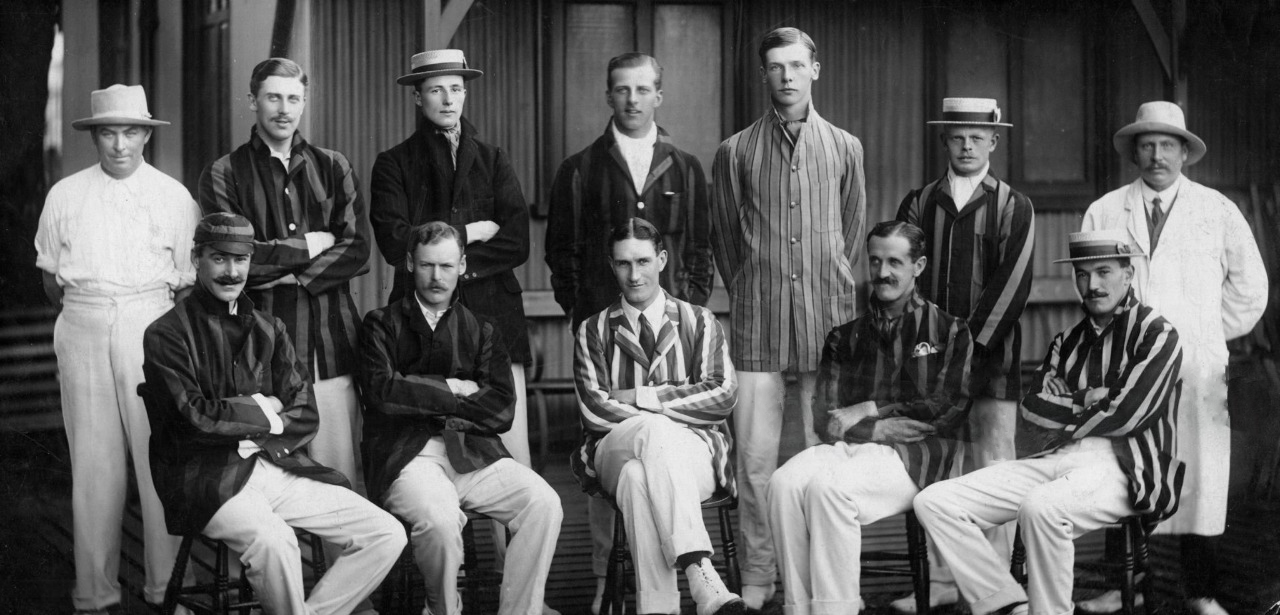
Group of men wearing striped shirt for cricket club photo group

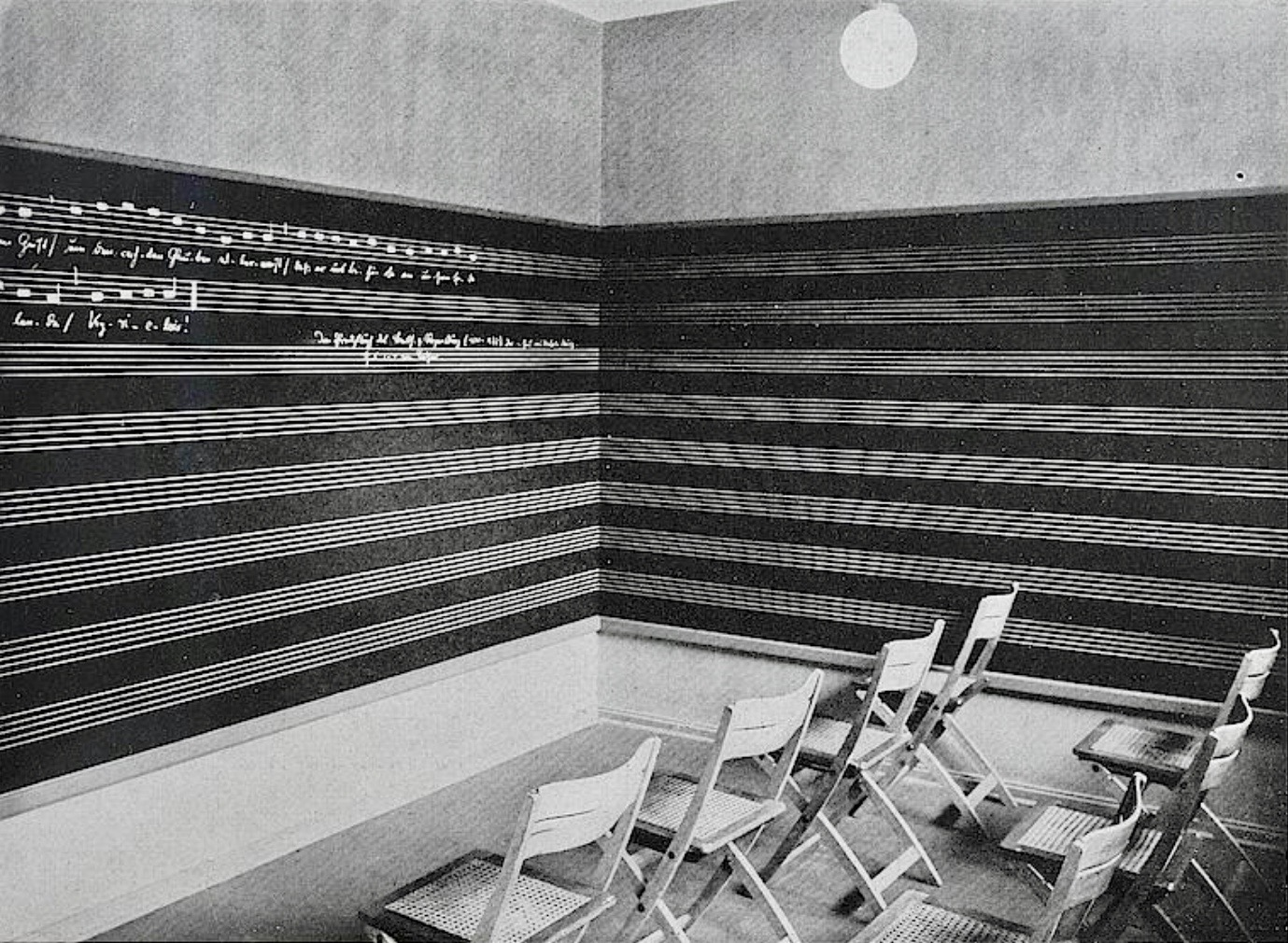
Classroom of Musikheim in Frankfurt, Germany designed by Erich Dieckmann (1929)

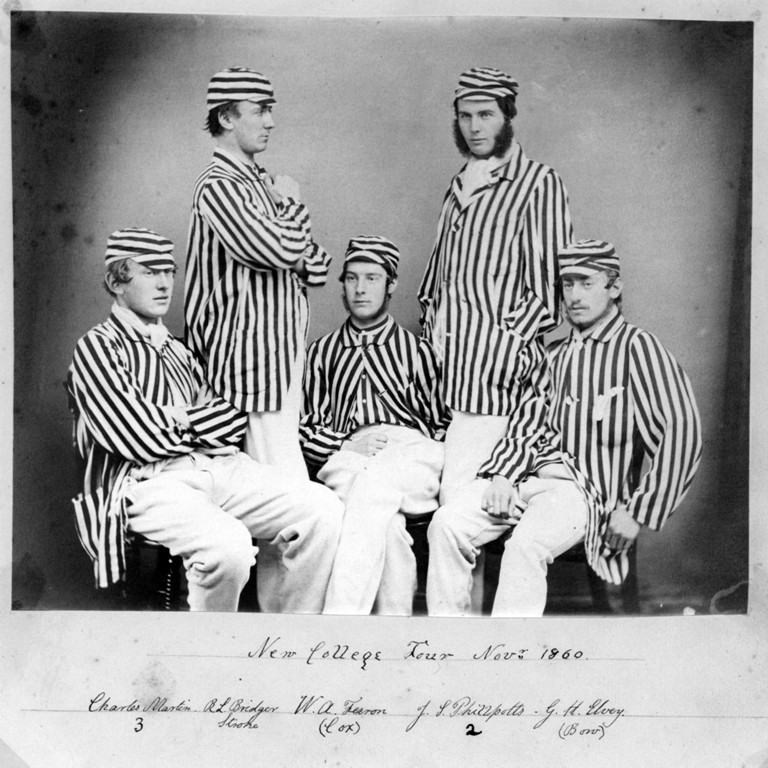
Row Boat clubs college student wearing striped shirt

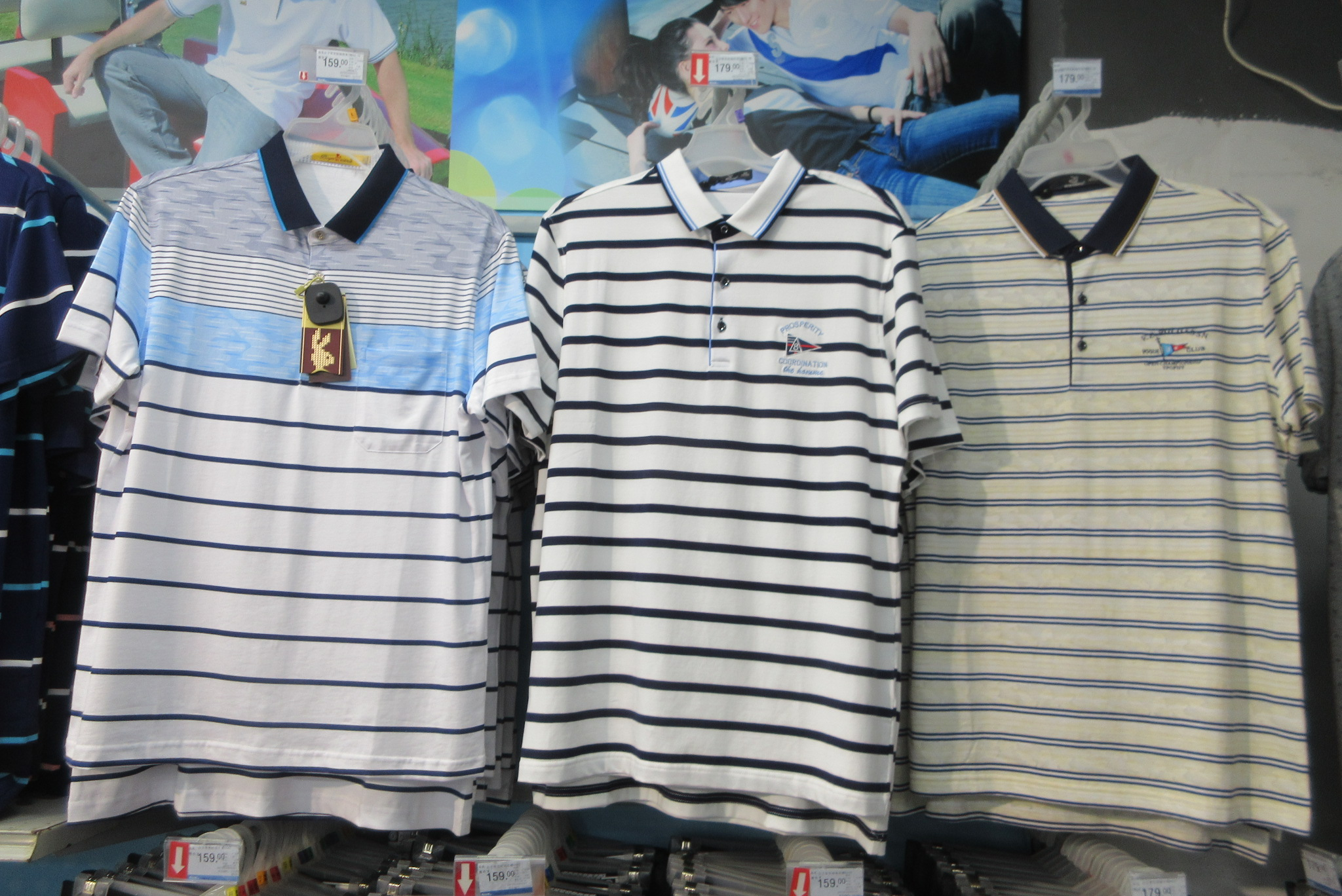
Striped shirt sold at market in China

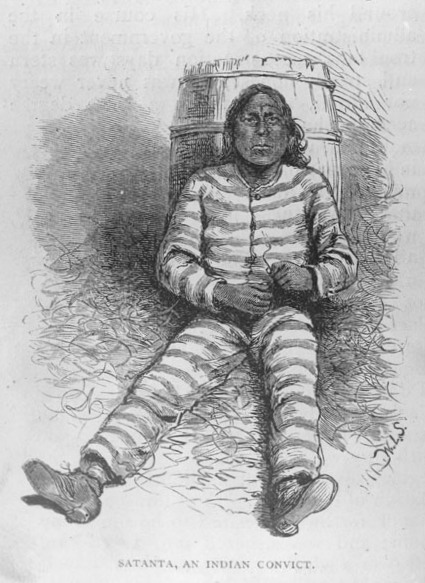
Caricatures of prisoner in stripe uniform

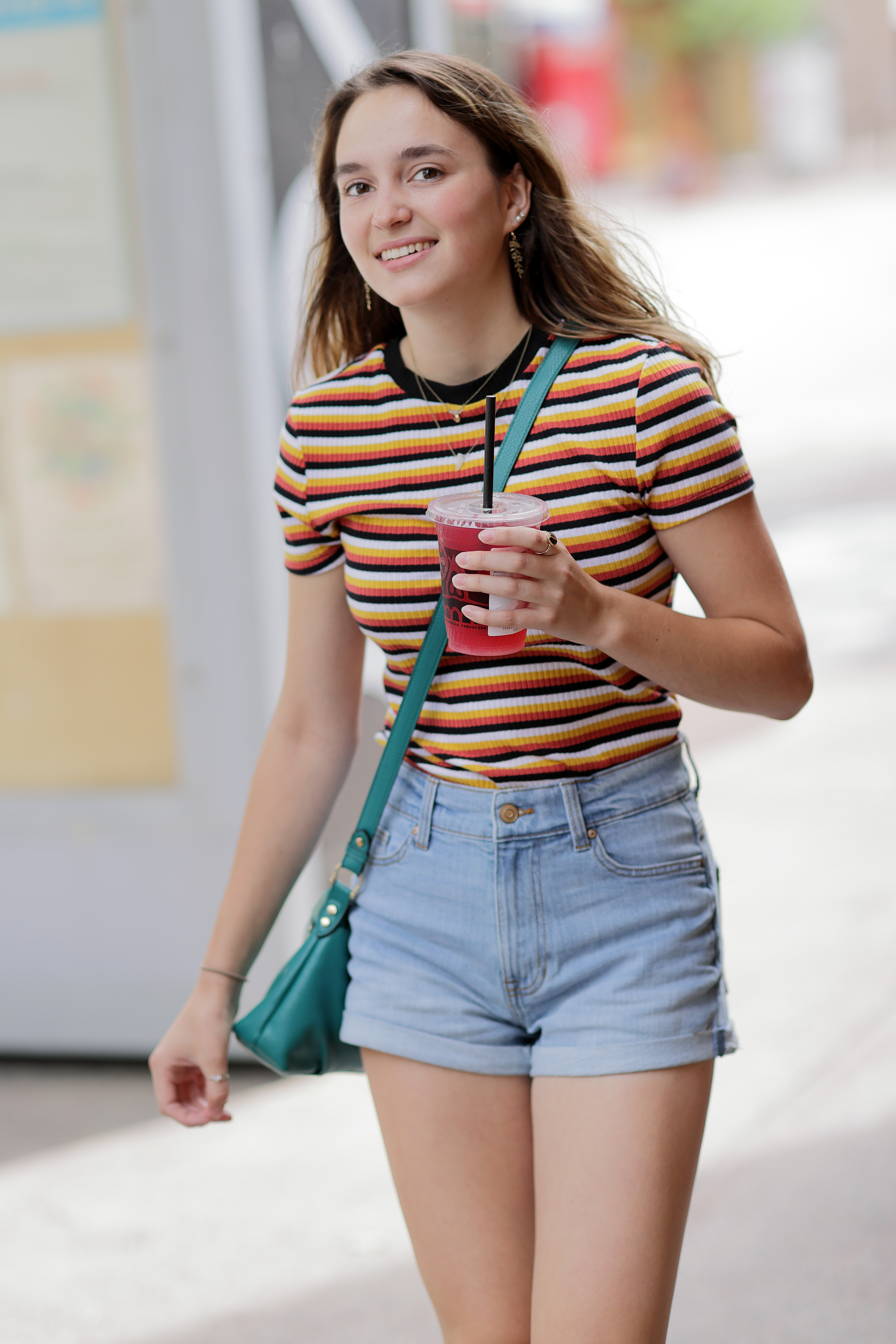
Smiling girl wearing orange, black and white striped shirt

Striped Barber's pole with red, white and blue stripes spiralling endlessly

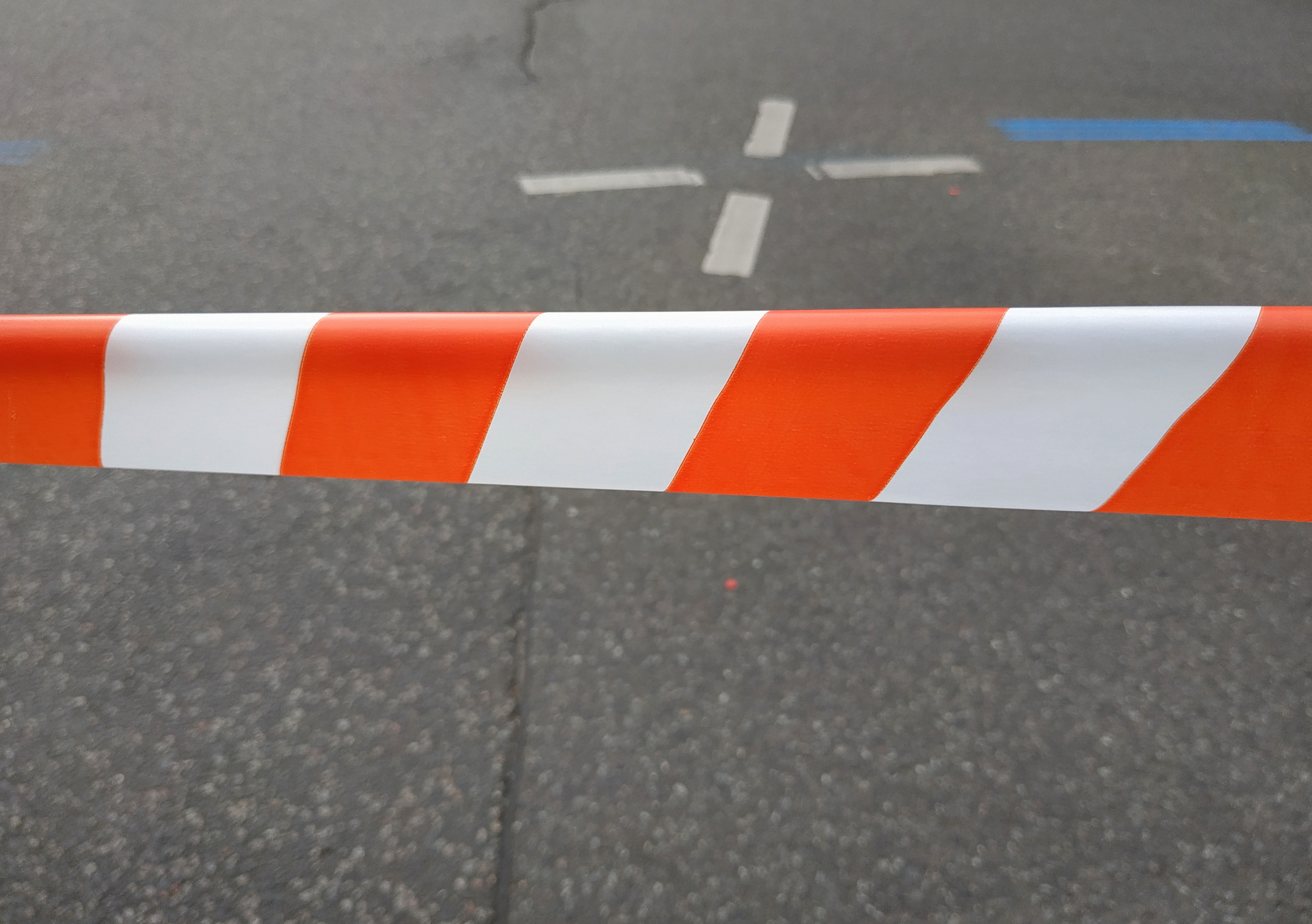
Red and white barricade tape

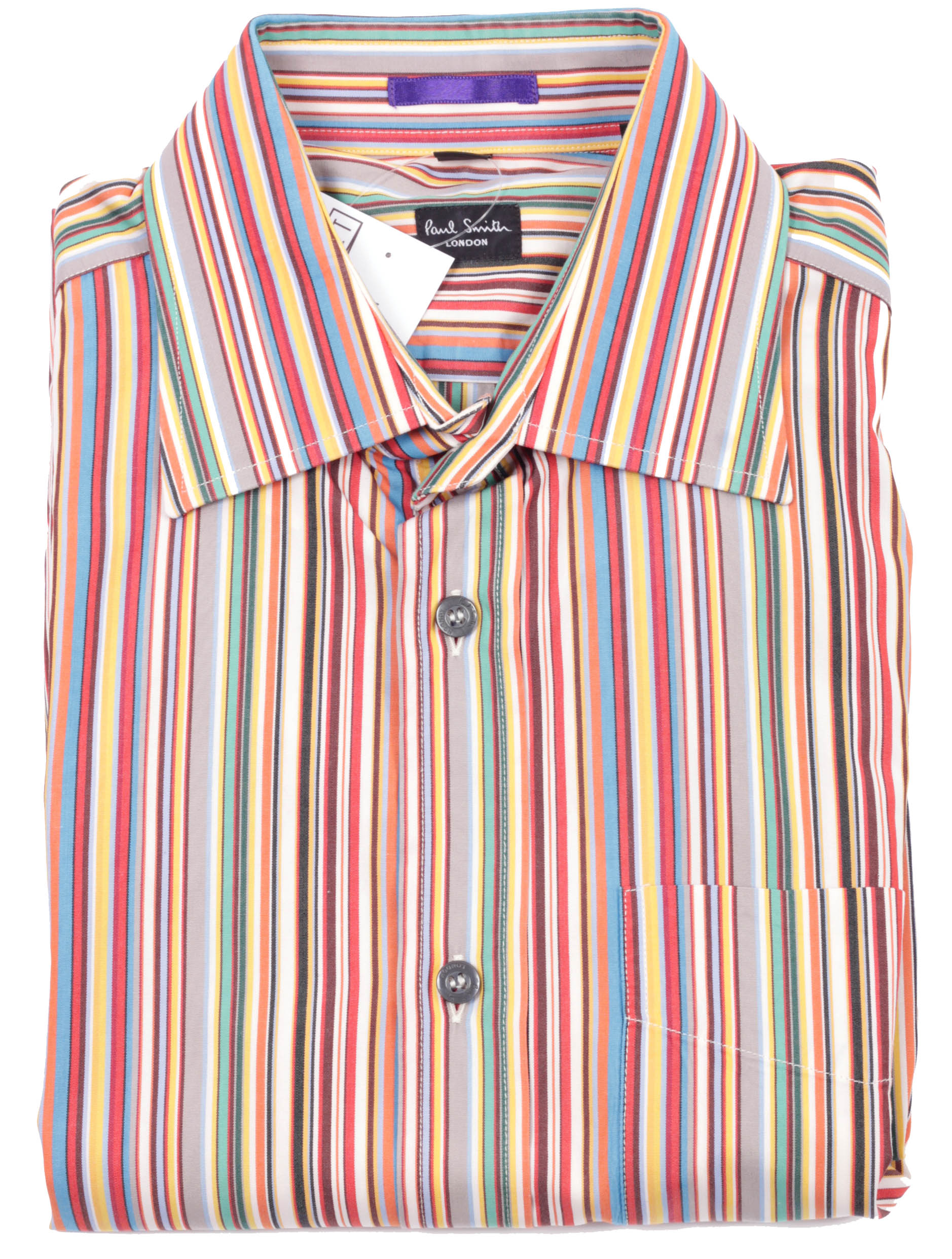
Paul Smith striped shirt

Warming stripes graphic by Ed Hawkins

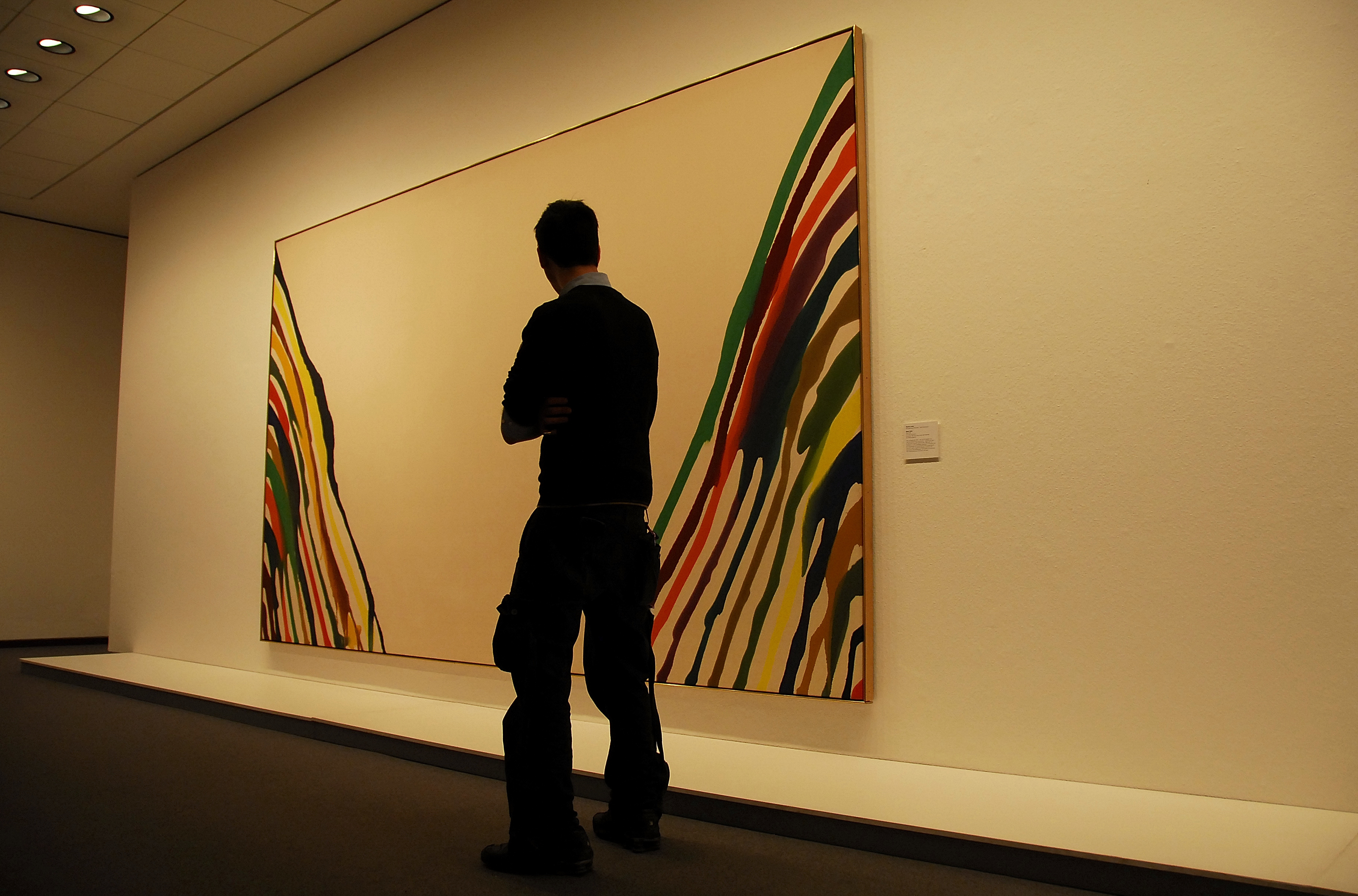
A museum visitor viewing Morris Louis's Beta Zeta at the Neue Nationalgalerie, Berlin

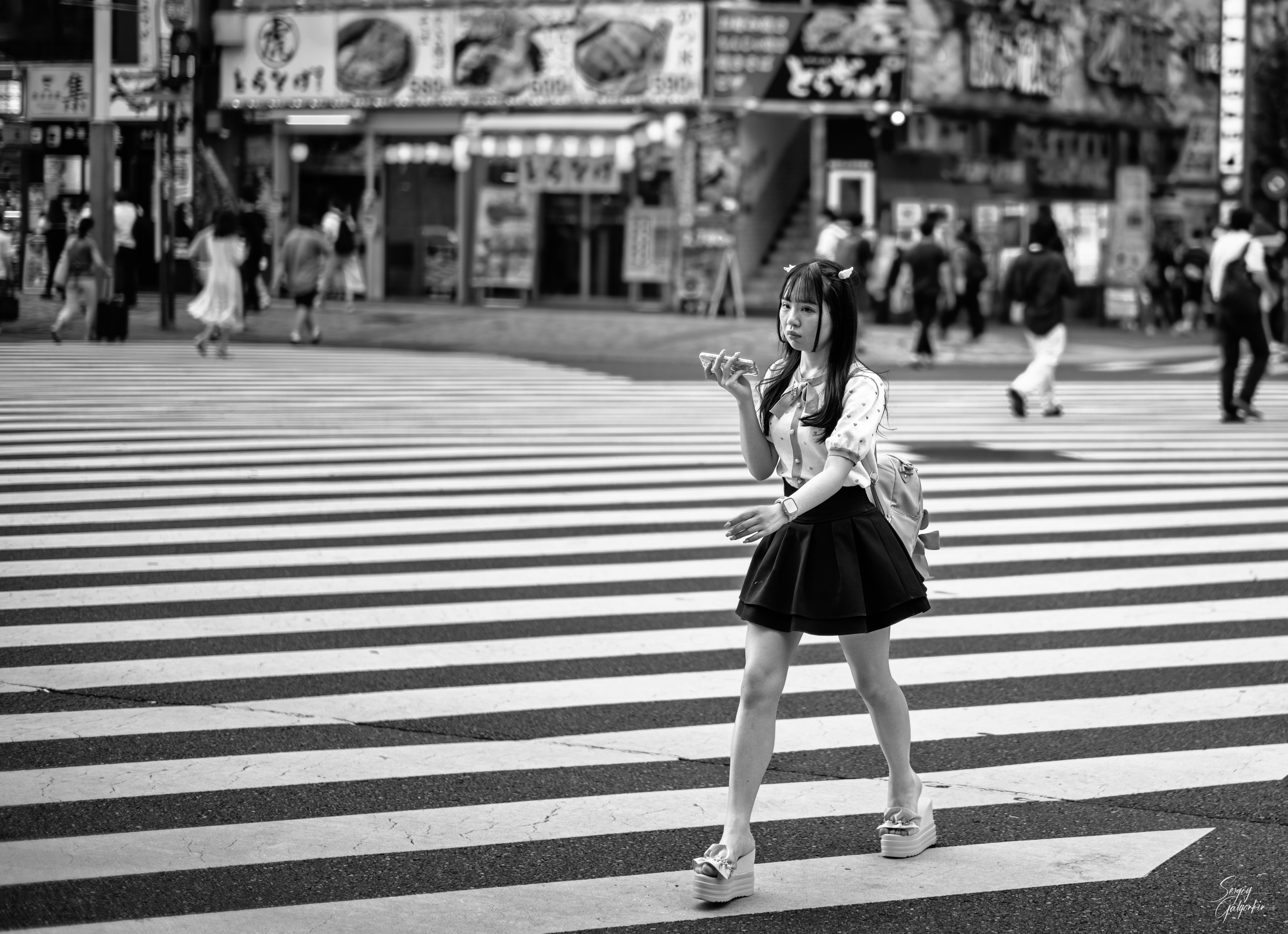
Zebra crossing, Tokyo

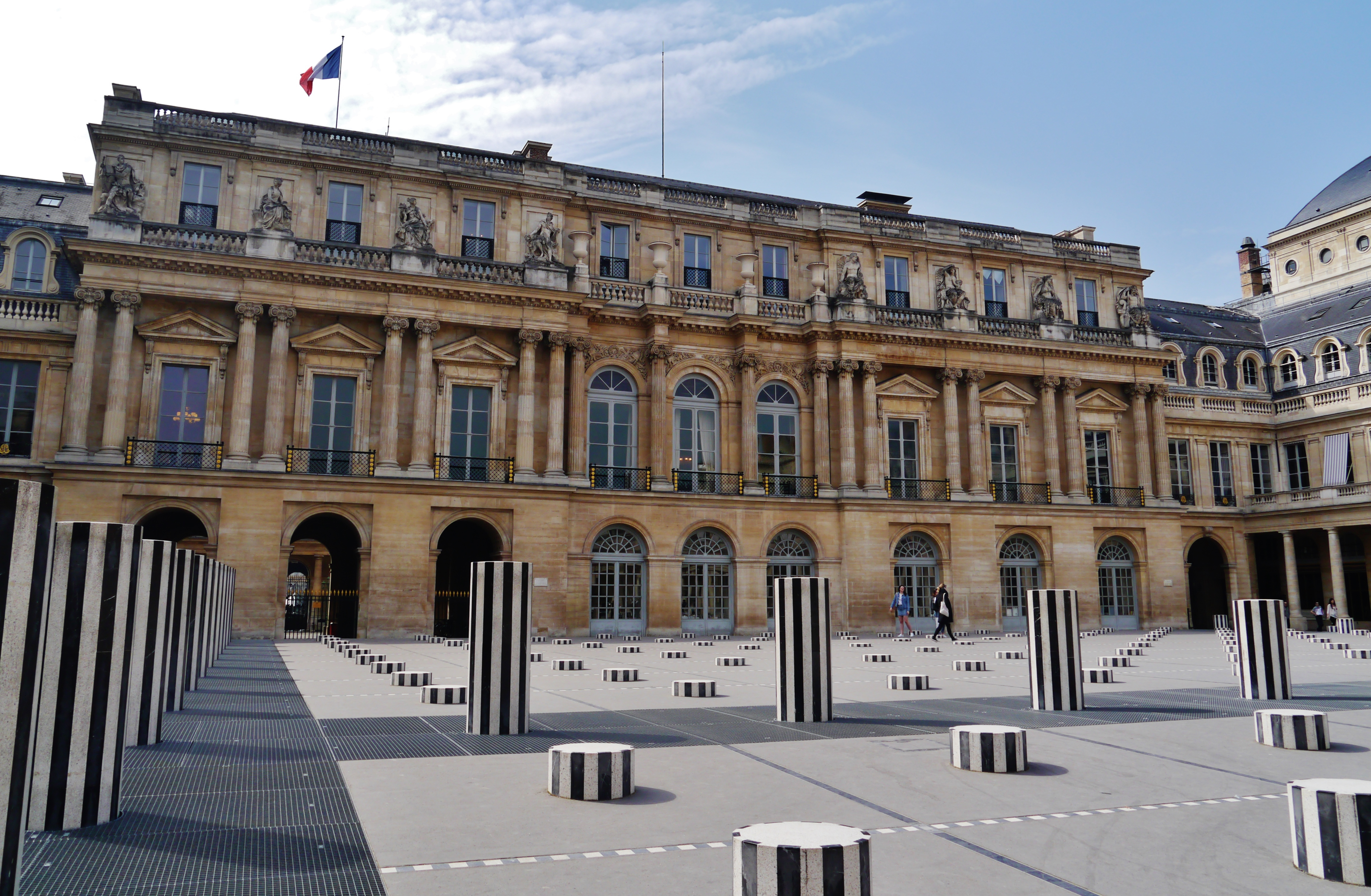
Les Deux Plateaux by Daniel Buren, Palais Royal, Paris (1986)

== See also ==
- Square tiling
- Sussi cloth
- The Devil's Cloth
- Argyle (pattern)
- Racing flags
- Flannel
- Gingham
- Madras (cloth)
- Marinière (cloth)
- Plaid (pattern)
- Polka dot
- Tartan
- Tattersall (cloth)
- Diapering
- Morris Louis
