= Paul Smith (fashion designer) =

English fashion designer (born 1946)

Sir Paul Smith CH CBE RDI
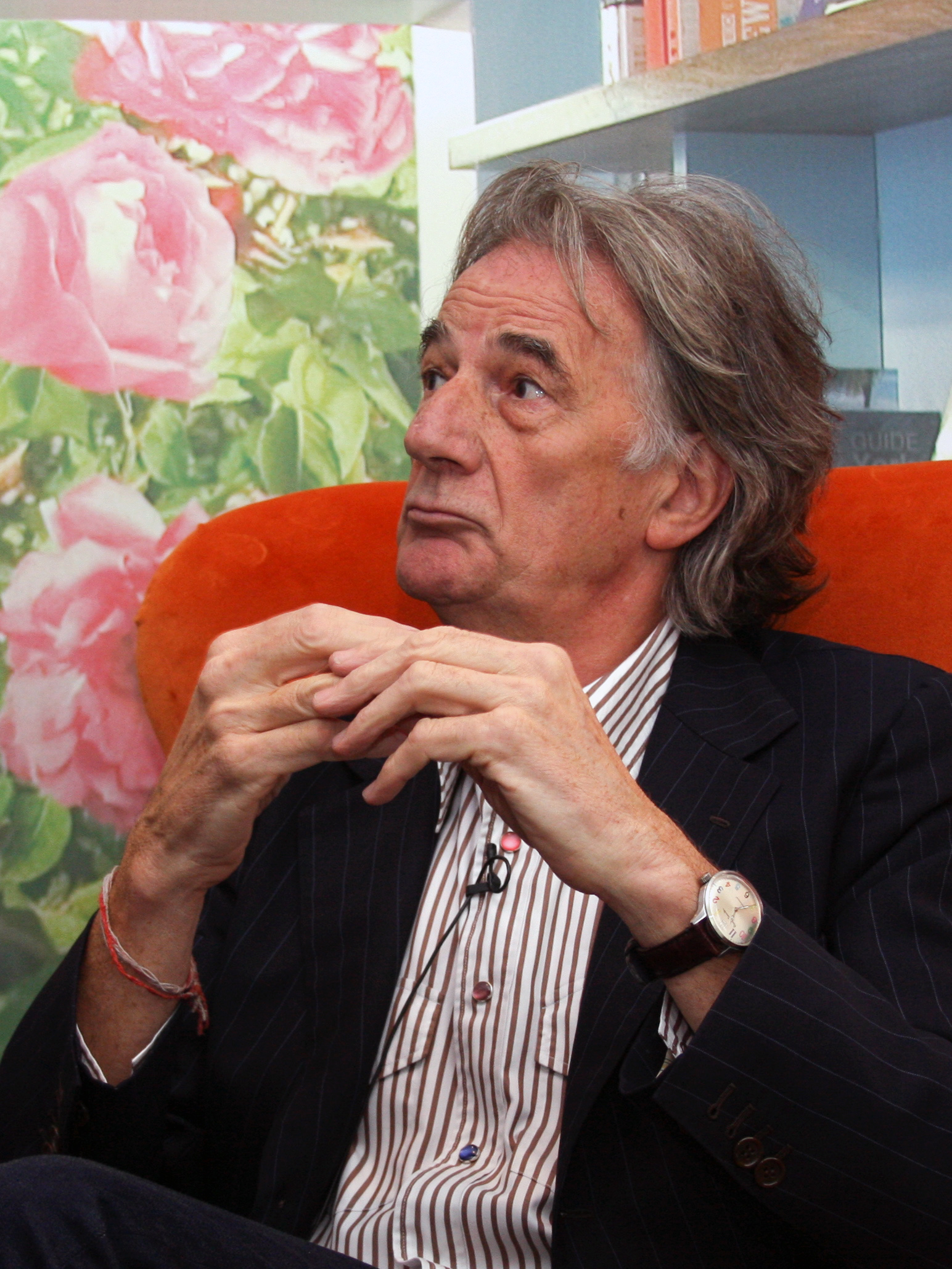
- Smith in 2009
- Born: Paul Brierley Smith; 5 July 1946 (age 80); Beeston, Nottinghamshire, England
- Spouse: Pauline Denyer (m. 1967)
- Type: Private
- Founded: 1970; 56 years ago in Nottingham, England
- Headquarters: Nottingham, England
- Area served: Worldwide
- Products: Clothing; accessories; eyewear; footwear
- Brands: Paul Smith; PS Paul Smith
- Owner: Paul Smith (majority); Itochu (40%)
- Website: paulsmith.com; paulsmithsfoundation.org

Sir Paul Brierley Smith (born 5 July 1946) is an English fashion designer, best known for his eponymous luxury brand. Founded by Smith in 1970, it has since expanded to 130 stores in more than 60 countries. The brand sells clothing and accessories through both physical shops and online. Its fluorescent pink flagship store in Los Angeles has become a widely photographed landmark.

Smith describes his clothing style as predominantly 'classic with a twist' and he is particularly well-known for adding colour to existing designs and for his 'trademark' multicoloured stripes and pinstripes. He was appointed a Royal Designer for Industry in 1991, was knighted in the 2000 Birthday Honours and in 2020 he was appointed a Member of the Order of the Companions of Honour (CH), for services to fashion.

== Early life ==
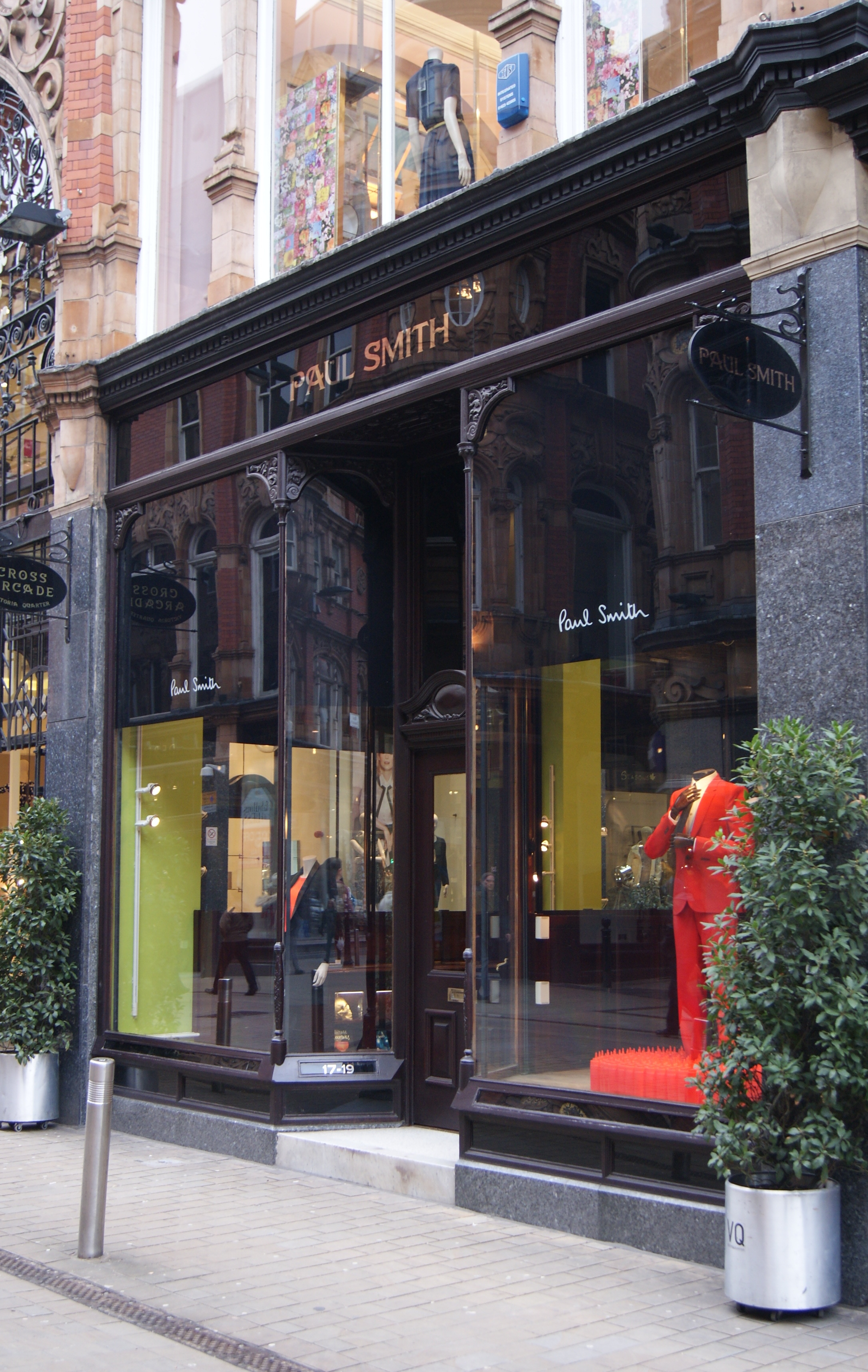
Paul Smith shop on King Edward Street, Leeds

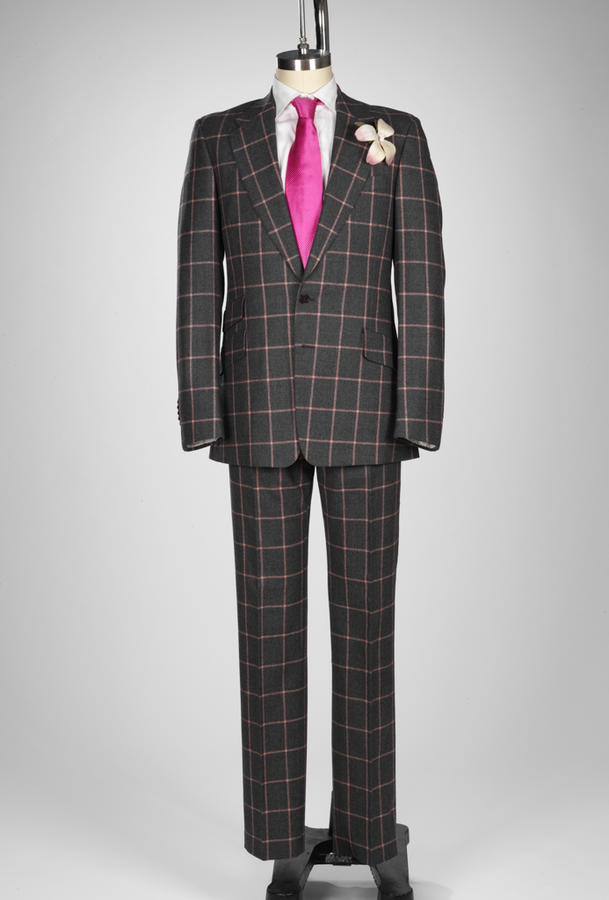
2007 Paul Smith suit, merino wool with pink windowpane check

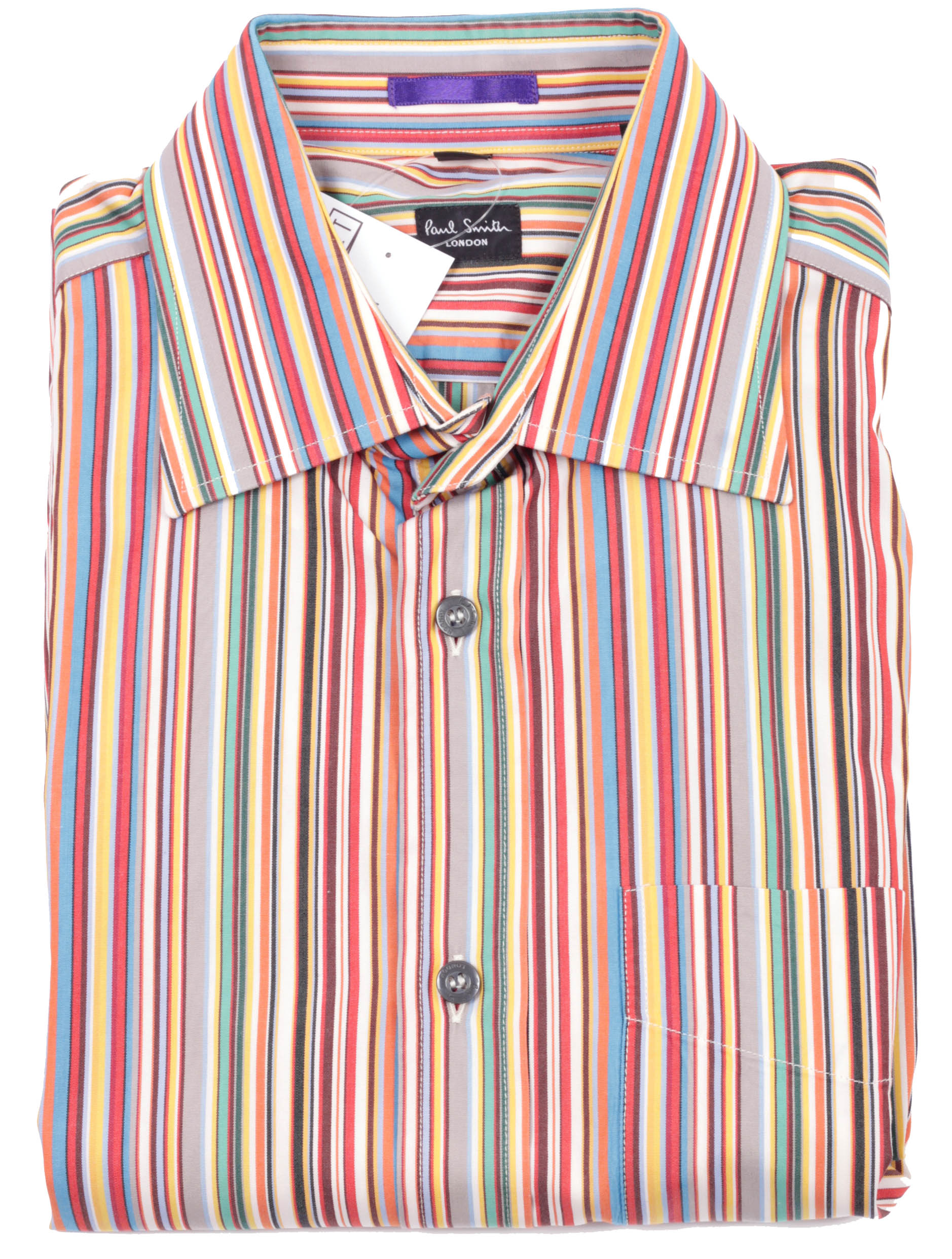
Paul Smith shirt showing the company's signature striped pattern

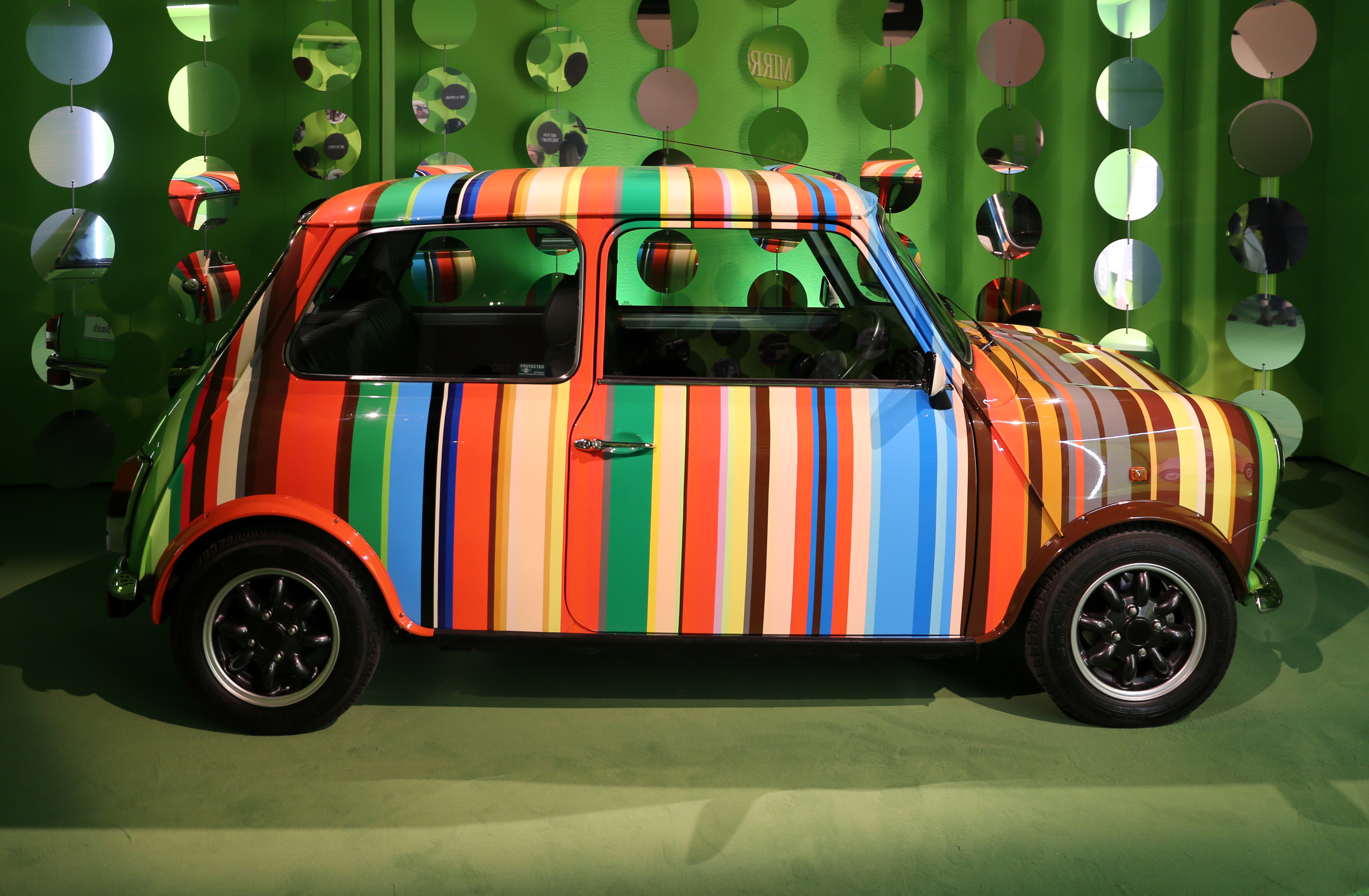
Mini by Paul Smith, 1997

Interview with Paul Smith about the exhibition 'Hello, My name is Paul Smith'

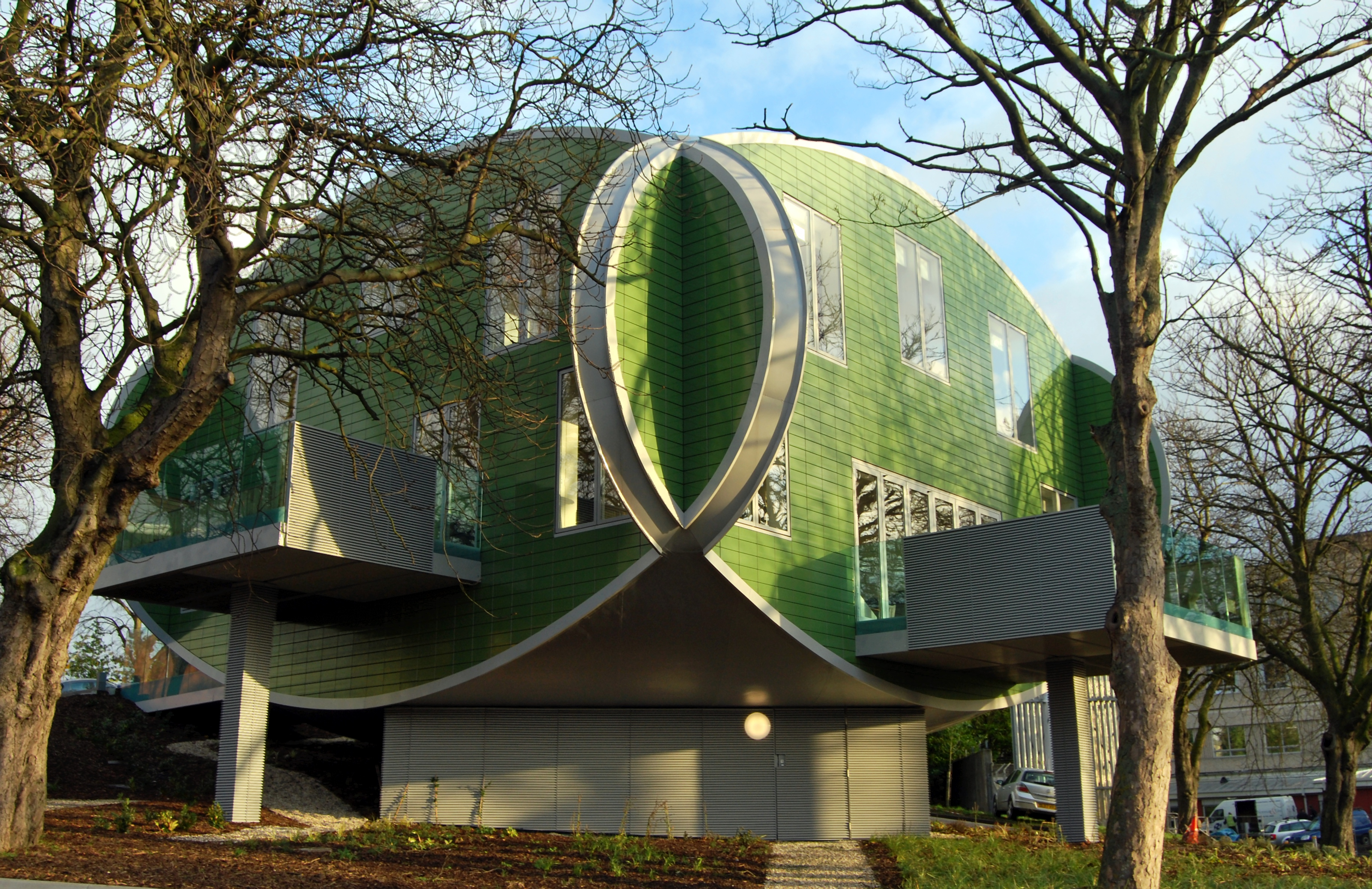
Maggie's Centre Nottingham, designed by Piers Gough. Smith helped design the interior.

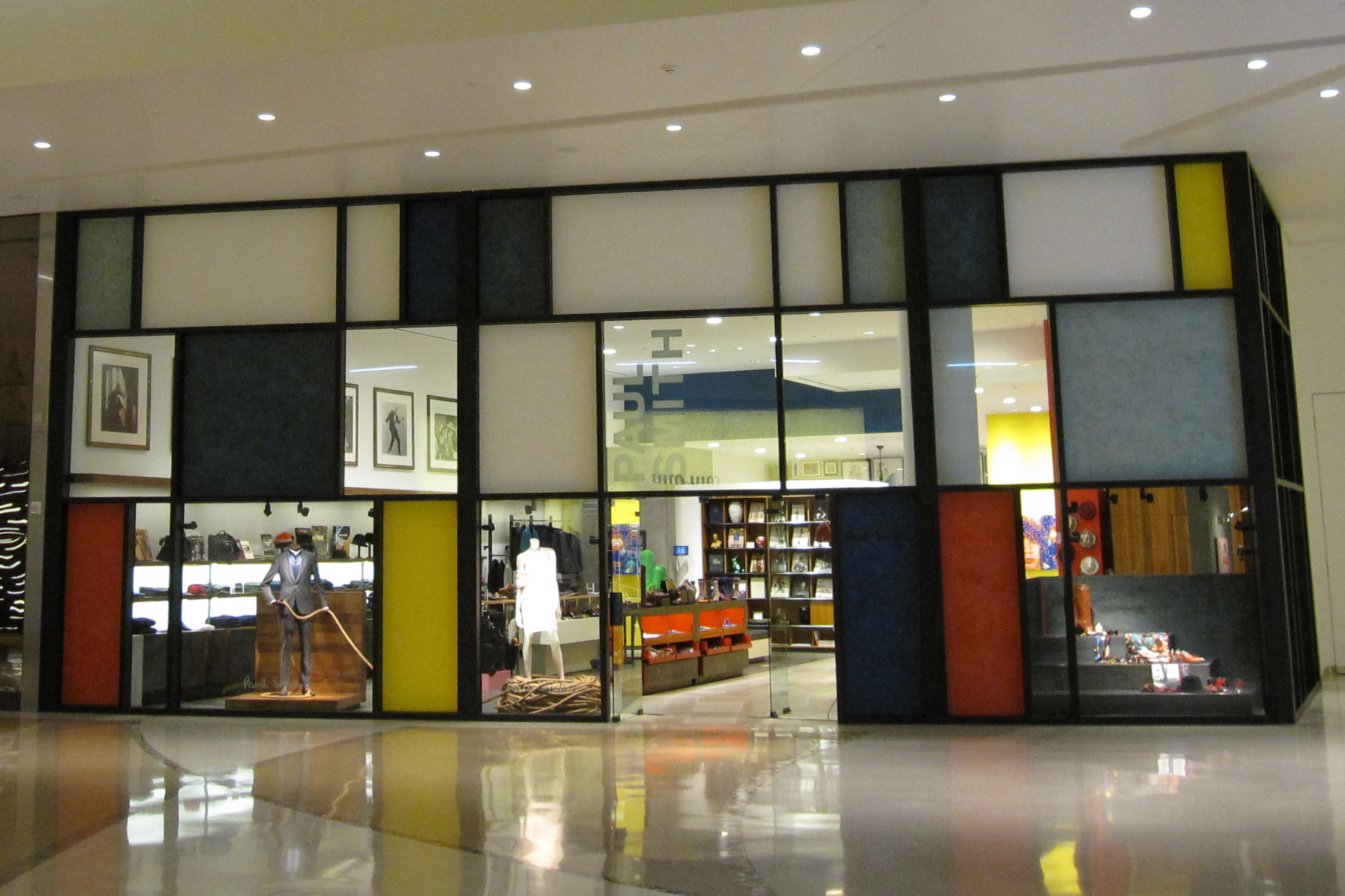
Paul Smith Boutique, Las Vegas

Smith was born in Beeston, Nottinghamshire, on 5 July 1946, the youngest of three children. He left school at age 15 without qualifications and, his father being a textile and clothing retailer, began work in a Nottingham clothing warehouse. One of his early ambitions was to become a professional cyclist, and cycling has been a lifelong influence in his work. But at the age of 17 he was involved in a serious accident that kept him in hospital for over three months. During his recovery he found the opportunity to make new friends at a local Art School and was introduced to the world of graphic art and fashion design. He left the warehouse and worked as store manager for a retail clothing and fashion start-up in Nottingham, owned by one of the new friends he had made. At the age of 21 he married Pauline, who had two young children from a previous marriage and was working as a teacher at the Art School. She had been trained as a fashion designer at the Royal College of Art in London and contributed to the creation of many of the articles sold at the business he was working at in Nottingham. Smith was manager there for six years. He later took classes in tailoring and began working with the Savile Row tailor Lincroft Kilgour.

== Paul Smith fashion chain ==
Smith opened his first shop, Paul Smith Vêtements Pour Homme, in Nottingham in 1970. The shop, located at 6 Byard Lane, had a floor area of only twelve feet by twelve feet (less than fifteen square metres) and sold a mix of established labels alongside Smith's own designs. His shop was open on Fridays and Saturdays only, and for the rest of the week Smith did freelance work in Nottingham and London. It was during this time that he took classes in tailoring and worked as a buyer for Browns in London.

In 1976 he presented his first menswear collection in Paris, featuring a combination of casual and semi-formal clothing. Three years later, in 1979, he opened his flagship London store on Floral Street in Covent Garden.

The brand expanded internationally in the 1980s. The first Japanese store opened in Tokyo in 1984. Smith opened a shop in New York City on Fifth Avenue in 1987, followed by additional locations, including a flagship on Greene Street as well as Williamsburg, Bleecker Street and Brookfield Place.

In 1990, Smith introduced a one-off collection for boys, which marked the beginning of his childrenswear range. In 2010 this developed into the seasonal line Paul Smith Junior, often including child-sized versions of adult pieces. He launched his first womenswear line, Paul Smith Women, in 1993, following demand from female customers who had been buying smaller sizes of his menswear for their own use. In 1993, also, he acquired the long-established workwear label R. Newbold, founded in 1885, and incorporated its styles into his own collections.

In 1995, the Design Museum in London exhibited 'True Brit', a show marking 25 years of his business. The exhibition later travelled to Glasgow for the 'Festival of Design' and then moved to his hometown of Nottingham and was put on display in Nottingham Castle.

The brand launched its e-commerce site in 2004. In 2006 Itochu bought a 40% stake in Paul Smith, but the company remained majority-owned by Smith. In January 2016, Smith combined his men's and women's fashion shows, showcasing during Paris Fashion Week. As of November 2025, the brand Paul Smith claims 130 stores in over 60 countries, including the USA, Japan and South Korea, in cities including New Delhi, Seoul, San Francisco, Paris, Amsterdam, Milan and Copenhagen. There are also stores dotted around England, in Nottingham, Manchester, Bicester, York and Ellesmere Port, as well as eight in London and three airside at Heathrow Airport, in terminals 2, 3 and 5.

== Partnerships and other business pursuits ==
=== Automotive and transport ===
In 1997, Smith designed a Mini that was produced in a limited edition of 1,800 cars. He later returned to the brand in 2021 with the Mini Electric using sustainable principles, with recycled and natural materials, for example cork. Smith also designed the Mini Strip, an electric model created with recycled and natural materials, intended to demonstrate sustainable design principles. He also worked with Triumph Motorcycles, restyling the Bonneville T100 in 2005 and with Land Rover on a bespoke Defender. In 2018 he collaborated with James Turner of Sports Purpose to cover a 1965 Porsche 911 with multicoloured stripes; the car went on to appear at Le Mans Classic and the Goodwood Festival of Speed.

=== Furniture, interiors and product design ===
Smith has undertaken a number of projects in furniture and interiors. In 2002 he worked with Cappellini on a small homeware collection, and in 2006 collaborated with Mercian Cycles on a series of bicycles. He also designed seating for Broadway Cinema in Nottingham that year. In 2014 he began a collaboration with Anglepoise, reimagining the Type 75 lamp as "Edition One"; further editions followed in 2016 and 2018. He has also produced designs for Gufram, creating a new version of its cactus-shaped coat stand in 2016.

=== Fashion, textiles and accessories ===
Smith's textile and fashion collaborations include his long-running partnership with US brand Maharam, which began in 2003, and work with Rapha, the cycle clothing company, from 2007. In 2010 he collaborated with Burton Snowboards, adding his signature stripe to boards and apparel. In 2012 he joined with John Lobb to produce a series of Oxford, derby and loafers. He has also worked with Kask on the design of cycling helmets (2015, 2018), with Caran d'Ache on two editions of its "849" pen (2015, 2016), and with Berry Bros & Rudd on a limited wine collection (2016). Further accessories projects include limited edition eyewear with Cutler & Gross in 2018, in tribute to his close friend Tony Gross. The same year Smith collaborated with the Globe-Trotter by redesigning their 20" trolley case to celebrate its 120-year anniversary, first showcased at the Salone del Mobile.

=== Design, culture and film ===
In 2005 Smith contributed to the 60th anniversary of Penguin Classics, redesigning the cover of Lady Chatterley's Lover by D. H. Lawrence. In 2009 he designed a limited series of bottles for Evian, becoming a third guest designer after Christian Lacroix and Jean-Paul Gaultier to contribute to the series. Smith designed sets of stamps for the Isle of Man Post Office to coincide with the 2012 London Olympics, and in 2011 produced four limited-edition prints marking the release of the film Tinker, Tailor, Soldier, Spy, whose production he had been involved in. In 2013 he created the official T-shirt for David Bowie's album The Next Day, and in 2015 collaborated again on designs for Bowie's final album Blackstar.

In 2019, Smith made a cameo appearance in the film Men in Black: International; he also designed the suits worn in the film.

=== Sport ===
Smith has designed uniforms, kits and accessories for major sporting events. He created a jersey for the start of the Tour de France in London in 2007, designed suits for the Manchester United team in 2009, and in 2013 produced the leader's jersey for the Giro d'Italia, including the Maglia Rosa. He also worked with New Balance in 2018 to mark the 30th anniversary of its 576 sneaker, creating footballs and boots in his trademark stripe pattern.

=== Technology ===
In 2005 Smith redesigned the Lasonic i931 boombox, giving it a "crisp, white design" with a touch of "Paul Smith's multicolor trademark seen in many of his clothes and accessories". In 2012 Smith partnered with Leica to release a limited-edition version of the Leica X2 camera.

=== Writing ===
In 2001 Smith published his first book, You Can Find Inspiration in Everything. In 2016, Smith's second book, Paul Smith's Cycling Scrapbook, was released, documenting a personal history of a sport about which he has been passionate all his life.

Since 2019, Smith has collaborated with the book illustrator Sam Usher to produce two illustrated children's story books featuring animals, travel and the pursuit of inspiration, published by Pavillion Children's Books.

== Archives and foundation ==
Paul Smith's Foundation in Nottingham maintains the designers archives and a collection of "5,000 garments and accessories, press cuttings, look-books and swatch books, objects relating to our many collaborations, and Paul's collection of magazines, books and objects."

== Awards ==
Smith has received a wide range of awards. He was appointed a Royal Designer for Industry in 1991. He was named Designer of the Year at the GQ Men of the Year Awards for four consecutive years. In 2010 he received the Condé Nast Traveller Innovation and Design Award, shared with Anya Hindmarch. The following year he was presented with the Outstanding Achievement Award at the British Fashion Awards 2011.

In addition to industry honours, Smith has been recognised by professional bodies. He holds an Honorary Fellowship of the British Institute of Interior Design. In 2015 he was included in GQ's 50 best dressed British men.

Smith has also been honoured by the Crown. He was appointed Commander of the Order of the British Empire (CBE) in the 1994 New Year Honours for services to fashion. He was knighted in the 2000 Birthday Honours and in 2020 he was appointed to the Order of the Companions of Honour (CH), again for services to fashion.

== Local recognition ==
In February 1997, Smith was made an honorary Freeman of the City of Nottingham in recognition of his contribution to fashion and his ties to the city. In 2013, Smith designed and made a school tie for Beeston Fields Primary School in Nottingham.

In October 2024, Nottingham Express Transit named their tram number 230 after Smith. Other local figures honoured in this way include football manager Brian Clough, footballer Mary Earps, actress Vicky McClure, and cricketer Stuart Broad.

== Publications ==
- Smith, Paul (2001). You Can Find Inspiration in Everything: if you can't, look again. Violette Editions. ISBN 978-1-900828-18-5. 288 pages
- Sudjic, Deyan; Loveday, Donna; Smith, Paul (2013). Hello, my name is Paul Smith: fashion and other stories. New York: Rizzoli International Publications. ISBN 978-0-8478-4158-5. Published in association with the Design Museum, London. 272 pages
- Hopper, David (2014). The Branded Gentry; How a New Era of Entrepreneurs Made their Names. Elliott and Thompson. ISBN 978-1-908739-78-0.
- Smith, Paul (2016). Paul Smith's Cycling Scrapbook. London: Thames & Hudson. ISBN 978-0-500-29236-5. 256 pages
- Smith, Paul; Usher, Sam (illus.) (2019). The Adventures of Moose & Mr Brown. London: Pavilion Children's Books. ISBN 978-1-84365-428-5. 40 pages
- Chambers, Tony, ed. (2020). Paul Smith. London: Phaidon Press. ISBN 978-1-83866-127-4. Edited by Tony Chambers, with a foreword by Jonathan Ive and a new preface by Paul Smith
- Smith, Paul; Usher, Sam (illus.) (2022). The Young Designers: The Adventures of Moose & Mr Brown. London: Pavilion Children's Books. ISBN 978-1-84365-476-6. 40 pages
