= Mercian Cycles =

English custom bicycle manufacturer

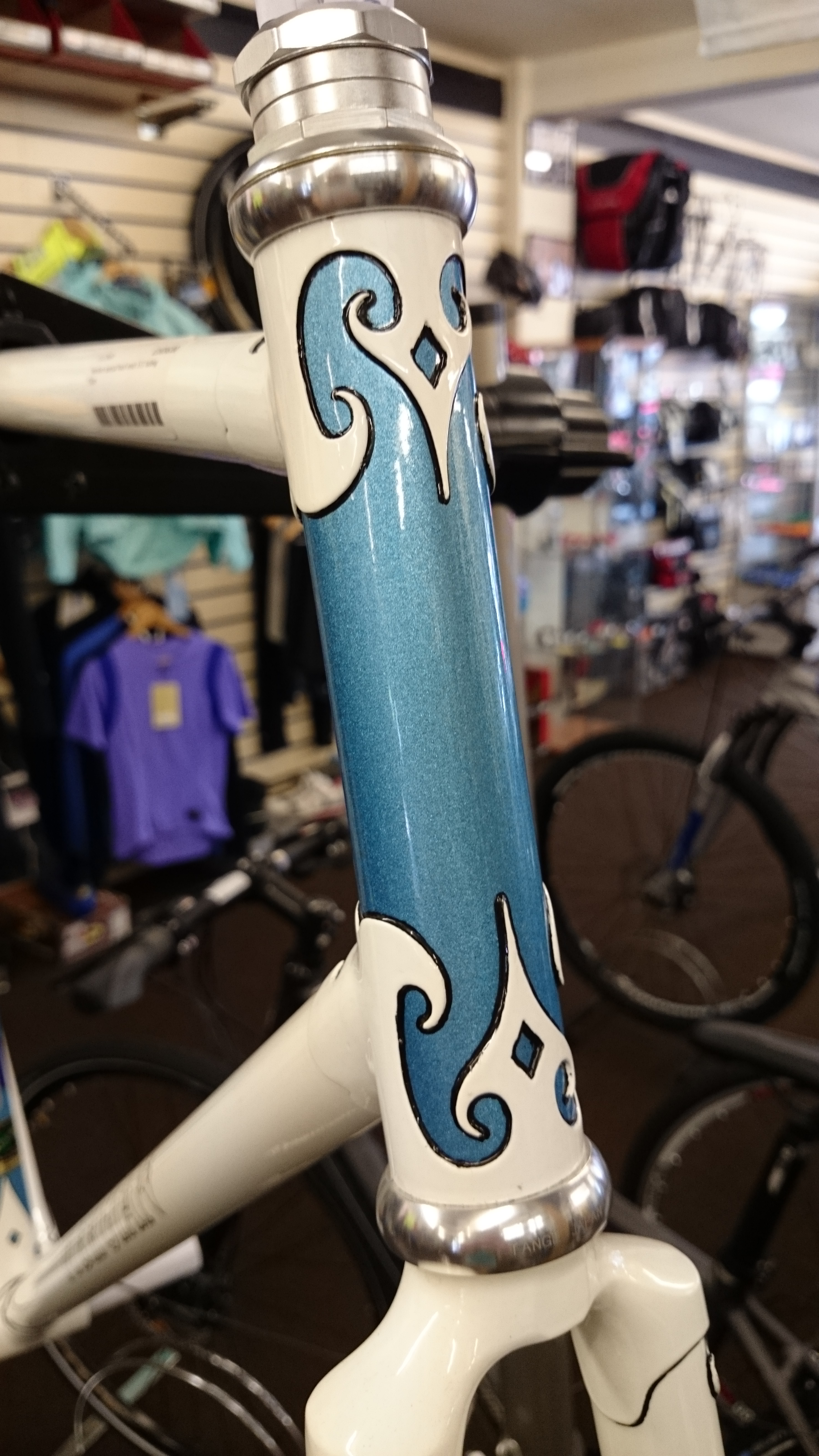
- Lugwork on a Vincitore headtube
- Founded: 1946
- Founder: Tom Crowther, Lou Barker
- Headquarters: Derby, Derbyshire, England
- Website: Mercian Cycles

Mercian Cycles is a bicycle manufacturer based in Derby, England. Founded in 1946, it produces handmade cycle frames.

== History ==
The firm was founded by Tom Crowther and Lou Barker in 1946 and named after the ancient kingdom of Mercia. Early Mercian frames were known as "crowbars", a pun on the surnames of Crowther and Barker.

From the original founders, the business passed to Ethel Crowther, ex-wife of founder Tom Crowther, followed by Mercian framebuilder Bill Betton. In 2002, Mercian Cycles was acquired by Grant and Jane Mosely.

In 2010, production was around 300 to 400 frames per year, with 20% being exported outside the United Kingdom; in the same period, touring bicycles accounted for around 67% of Mercian's production, with track bicycles making up another 25%.

Mercian Cycles operated a retail shop in Alvaston, Derby, until early 2019, when it relocated back to its manufacturing unit within Derby.

=== Administration ===
In May 2024 the business entered voluntary liquidation, and was soon acquired by four cycling enthusiasts. Former workers were engaged at the traditional works, and in October 2025 new premises at Little Eaton, Derby, were secured.

== Specifications ==
Frames are generally custom-built to a rider's required dimensions, and may use hand-cut lugs. Mercian frames were traditionally built using steel, originally Reynolds 531, though as of 2010, newer steels such as Reynolds 853 and Reynolds 953 and part-carbon construction were in use. Before steel was superseded by lighter materials, riders using Mercian won national and international competitions.

Mercian has commissioned frame colour schemes from designer Sir Paul Smith, who owns and rides several Mercian track bikes.
