= Michel Pastoureau =

French art historian (born 1947)

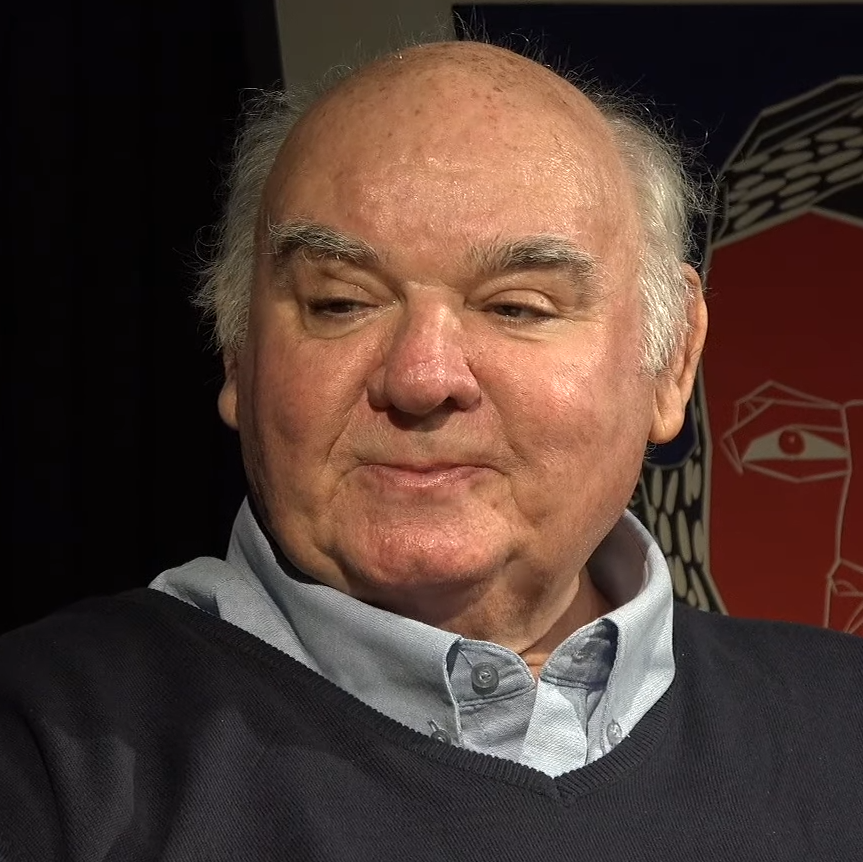
- Born: 17 June 1947 (age 79); Paris, France

Academic background
- Education: École Nationale des Chartes

Academic work
- Discipline: history
- Sub-discipline: medieval history
- Institutions: Bibliothèque nationale de France; École pratique des hautes études
- Main interests: symbology
- Notable works: Figures de l'héraldique

Michel Pastoureau (born 17 June 1947) is a French professor of medieval history and an expert in Western symbology.

== Biography ==
Pastoureau was born in Paris on 17 June 1947. He studied at the École Nationale des Chartes, a college for prospective archivists and librarians. After writing his 1972 thesis about heraldic bestiaries in the Middle Ages, he worked in the coins, medals and antiquities department of the Bibliothèque nationale de France until 1982.

Since 1983 he has held the Chair of History of Western Symbolism (Chaire d'histoire de la symbolique occidentale) and is a director of studies at the Sorbonne's École pratique des hautes études. He is an academician of the Académie internationale d'héraldique (International Academy of Heraldry) and honorary president of the Société française d'héraldique et de sigillographie (French Heraldry and Sphragistic Society). When he received an honorary doctorate from the University of Lausanne in 1996, he was described as an eminent scholar who has made a radical contribution to several disciplines.

Professor Pastoureau has published widely, including work on the history of colours, animals, symbols, and the knights of the Round Table. He has also written on emblems and heraldry, as well as sigillography and numismatics.

== Works ==
- Vert. Histoire d'une couleur. Éditions du Seuil, Paris 2013, ISBN 978-2-02-109325-4.
- L'ours. Histoire d'un roi déchu, éditions du Seuil, 2007
- Les chevaliers de la Table ronde, éditions du Gui, 2006, ISBN 2-9517417-5-8
- Une histoire symbolique du Moyen Âge occidental, Seuil, La librairie du XXIe siècle, Paris, 2004, ISBN 2-02-013611-2 (Trad. esp.: Una historia simbólica de la Edad Media occidental, Buenos Aires/Madrid, Katz editores S.A, 2006, ISBN 84-935187-3-5)
- Traité d'héraldique (Col. Grands manuels Picard). Paris: Picard éditeur, 1st. 1979 (2nd. ed. 1993; 3rd, 1997; 4th. 2003, revised and augmented; 5th ed. 2008). The 4th ed. [ISBN 2-7084-0703-1] added Part IV, entitled "Quinze ans de recherches Héraldiques" where a state-of-the-art is attempted and three case studies are presented.
- Bleu: Histoire d'une couleur, éditions du Seuil, 2000
- Les animaux célèbres, Bonneton, 2001
- Les emblèmes de la France, éditions Bonneton, Paris, 1998
- Jésus chez le teinturier: couleurs et teintures dans l'Occident médiéval, Le Léopard d'or, Paris, 1997, ISBN 2-86377-150-7
- Figures de l'héraldique, collection « Découvertes Gallimard » (nº 284), série Traditions. Éditions Gallimard, 1996, ISBN 9782070533657
  - UK edition – Heraldry: Its Origins and Meaning, 'New Horizons' series. Thames & Hudson, 1997, ISBN 0-500-30074-7
  - US edition – Heraldry: An Introduction to a Noble Tradition, "Abrams Discoveries" series. Harry N. Abrams, 1997, ISBN 0-810-92830-2
- Dictionnaire des couleurs de notre temps, Bonneton, Paris, 1992
- L'étoffe du diable: une histoire des rayures et des tissus rayés, éditions du Seuil, 1991
- La vie quotidienne en France et en Angleterre au temps des chevaliers de la Table ronde, Hachette 1991, ISBN 2-01-017737-1
- L'hermine et le sinople, études d'héraldique médiévale, Le Léopard d'or, Paris, 1982, ISBN 2-86377-017-9
- Le Cochon : Histoire d'un cousin mal aimé, collection « Découvertes Gallimard » (nº 545), série Culture et société, 2009, ISBN 9782070360383

=== In English translation ===
- Pink: A History of a Color (Princeton University Press)
- White: A History of a Color (Princeton 2022), ISBN 978-0-691-24349-8
- Yellow: A History of a Color (Princeton 2019), ISBN 978-0-691-19825-5
- Red: The History of a Color (Princeton 2016), ISBN 978-0-691-17277-4
- Green: The History of a Color (Princeton 2014), ISBN 978-0-691-15936-2
- The Bear: History of a Fallen King (Harvard 2011), ISBN 978-0-674-04782-2
- Black: The History of a Color (Princeton 2008), ISBN 978-0-691-13930-2
- Blue: The History of a Color (Princeton 2001), ISBN 0-691-09050-5
- The Devil's Cloth: A History of Stripes (Columbia 2001), ISBN 0-231-12366-3
- The Bible and the Saints, with Gaston Duchet-Suchaux (Flammarion 1994), ISBN 2-08-013564-3
