= Osnaburg =

Sturdy, often unbleached, plain-woven fabric of cotton; originally made of flax

Osnaburg is a general term for coarse, plain-weave fabric. It also refers specifically to a historic fabric originally woven in flax but also in tow or jute, and from flax or tow warp with a mixed or jute weft.

== Historic osnaburg ==
Osnaburg fabric may have been first imported into English-speaking countries from the German city of Osnabrück, from which it gets its name. Scottish weavers produced a coarse lint- or tow-based linen imitation in the later 1730s, which quickly became the most important variety in east-central Scotland. Sales quadrupled, from 0.5 million yards in 1747 to 2.2 million yards in 1758. It was exported mainly to England, the Netherlands, and Britain's colonies in America. In the Atlantic plantation complex, prior to the abolition of slavery, osnaburg was the fabric most often used for slave garments.

It was in widespread use worldwide for general utility and housework, with finer varieties used as common sheeting. Grades contained from 20 to 36 threads per inch and 10 to 15 picks per inch.

=== In culture ===
- "Osnaburg covers" are referenced by Cormac McCarthy as wagon coverings in his novel, Blood Meridian (1985), which details the murderous Texas Glanton gang of the 1850's.
- "Osnaburg sheets" are referenced by Josiah A. Gregg as cargo coverings in his 1844 book, "Commerce of the Prairies," which details his eyewitness experiences as a trader on the Santa Fe Trail.
- In The Prairie Traveler (1859) Captain Randolph B. Marcy recommends that every wagon used to cross the plains by settlers "be furnished ... with double osnaburg covers, to protect its contents from the sun and weather." This use is also mentioned in Gwen Bristow's novel Jubilee Trail: in Chapter 10, it is spelled osnabrig.
- In the novel S. by J. J. Abrams and Doug Dorst, there is a description of a sailor "clad neck-to-shin in sailor's osnaburg".
- In the novel Book of Negroes by Lawrence Hill, there is a description of slaves being given garments of osnaburg cloth to wear.
- In the novel The Water Dancer by Ta-Nehisi Coates, the main character, a slave named Hi, wears osnaburg clothing.

== Modern osnaburg ==
Fabric sold today as "osnaburg" is typically an unprocessed, relatively stiff cotton twill. Though rough by modern standards, it is much finer and softer than historic osnaburg.

The Spanish word "osnaburgo" is still commonly used in Chile for coarsely woven cotton or linen fabric.

== See also ==
- Negro cloth
