= Abrawan =

Fine mulmul cloth from Dacca

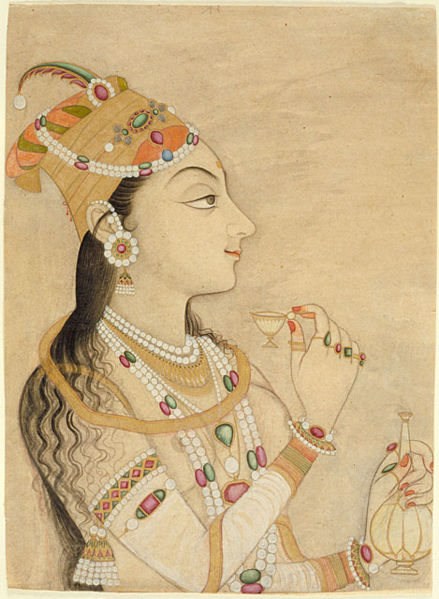
Nur Jahan in fine muslin dress.

Abrawan (āb-i-ravān) was a kind of muslin cloth produced in Indian subcontinent. The Abrawan was characterized by the nature of the fabric that was like flowing water.

== Name ==
Abrawan means ''running water'' that symbolizes its fineness.

''Running water'' and ''Woven air'' were poetic names of contemporaneous muslins.

== Weave ==
Abrawan was a plain weave fabric made primarily of cotton, with silk variations available. It was a transparent, lightweight structure, one of Dacca's finest muslins. Weavers used to weave qualities similar to Abrawan during the monsoon season to protect the yarn from breaking due to dry weather.

== Quotes ==
Abrawan was recorded for its fine texture. There are two stories related to Abrawan that demonstrate the grandeur of the fabric. The first one is related to an argument between the sixth Mughal emperor Aurangzeb and his daughter where the king is arguing modesty. Another tale is about the Nawab of Bengal Alivardi Khan expelling of a weaver who, ignored, let a cow swallow the Abrawan cloth overlaid on a lawn.

The Hindoos amuse us with two stories, as instances of the fineness of this muslin. One, that the Emperor Aurungzebe was angry with his daughter for exposing her skin through her clothes; whereupon the young princess remonstrated in her justification that she had seven jamahs or suits on; and another, in the Nabob Allaverdy Khawn's time a weaver was chastised and turned out of the city for his neglect, in not preventing his cow from eating up a piece of abrooan, which he had spread and carelessly left on the grass.—Bolt

== Present day uses ==
With time, the real artwork has inevitably lost all of its authentic characteristics. The imitation can be seen as

=== Tarbana ===
A form of Abrawan is Tarbana Sari. Tarbana is a silk and gold threaded tissue Sari. The fabric used in the production of Tarbanas contains a warp of silk and a weft of zari.

== See also ==
- Mughal Karkhanas
- Mulboos khas
