= Cambric =

Soft, plain-woven cotton or linen fabric with a lustrous finish

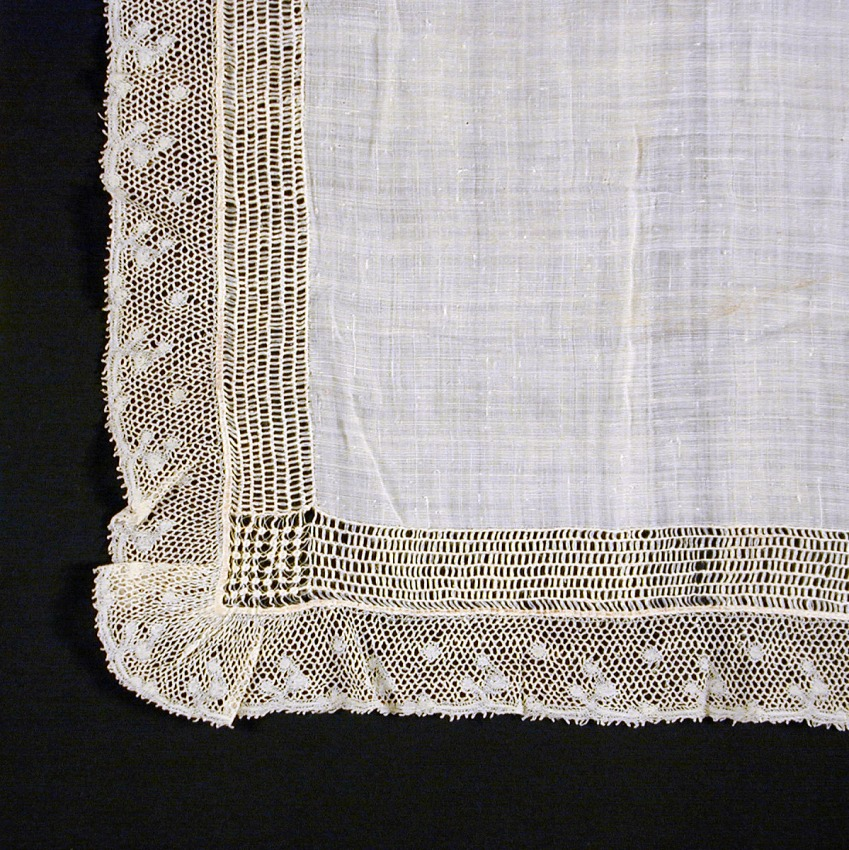
White applique on linen batiste, a type of cambric, with needlepoint fillings

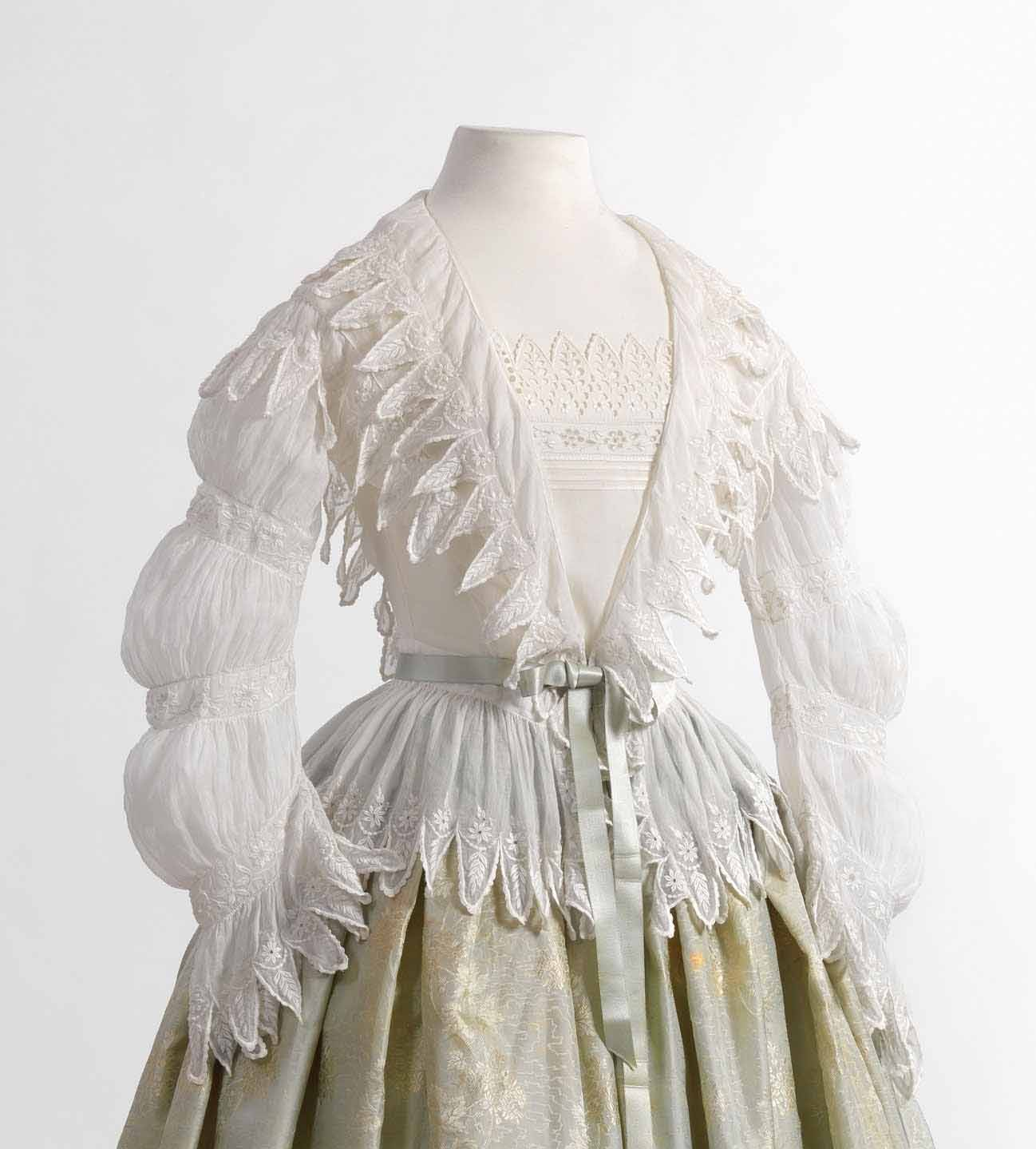
Morning blouse made of cambric

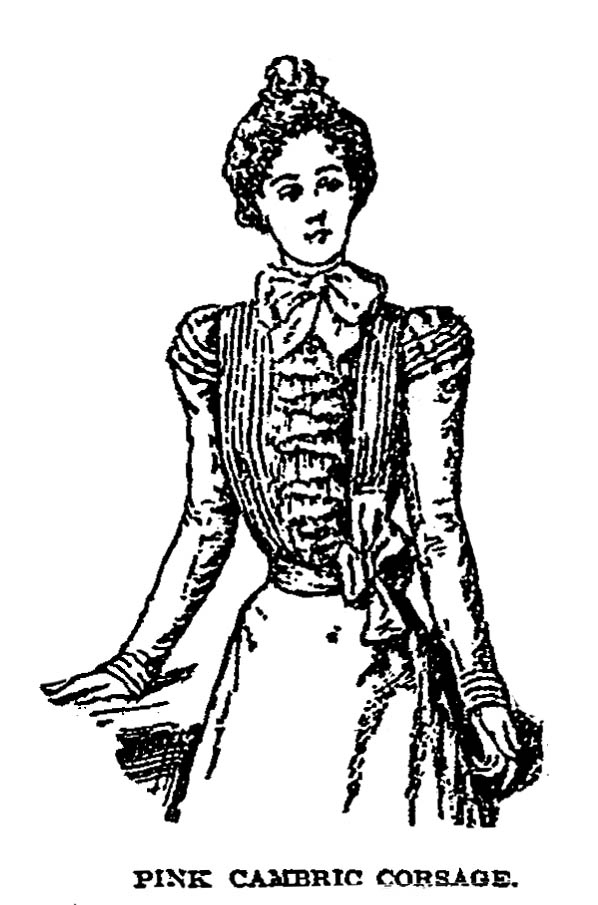
Corsage made of cambric (1898)

Cambric or batiste is a fine dense cloth. It is a lightweight plain-weave fabric, originally from the commune of Cambrai (in present-day northern France), woven greige (neither bleached nor dyed), then bleached, piece-dyed, and often glazed or calendered. Initially it was made of linen; from the 18th and 19th centuries the term came to apply to cotton fabrics as well.

Chambray is a similar fabric, with a coloured (often blue or grey) warp and white filling; the name "chambray" replaced "cambric" in the United States in the early 19th century.

Cambric is used as fabric for linens, shirts, handkerchiefs, ruffs, lace, and in cutwork and other needlework. Dyed black, it is also commonly used as the dustcover on the underside of upholstered furniture.

== Description ==
Cambric is a finely woven cloth with a plain weave and a smooth surface appearance, the result of the calendering process. It may be made of linen or cotton. The fabric may be dyed any of many colours.

Batiste is a kind of cambric; it is "of similar texture, but differently finished, and made of cotton as well as of linen". Batiste also may be dyed or printed. Batiste is the French word for cambric, and some sources consider them to be the same, but in English, they are two distinct fabrics.

Chambray, though the same type of fabric as cambric, has a coloured warp and a white weft, though it may be "made from any colour as you may wish, in the warp, and also in the filling; only have them differ from each other."

Chambray differs from denim in that "chambray's warp and weft threads will alternate one over the other, while denim’s warp thread will go over two threads in the weft before going under one." As a result, the colour of chambray cloth is similar front and back, while the reverse side of denim is lighter in colour.

== History ==
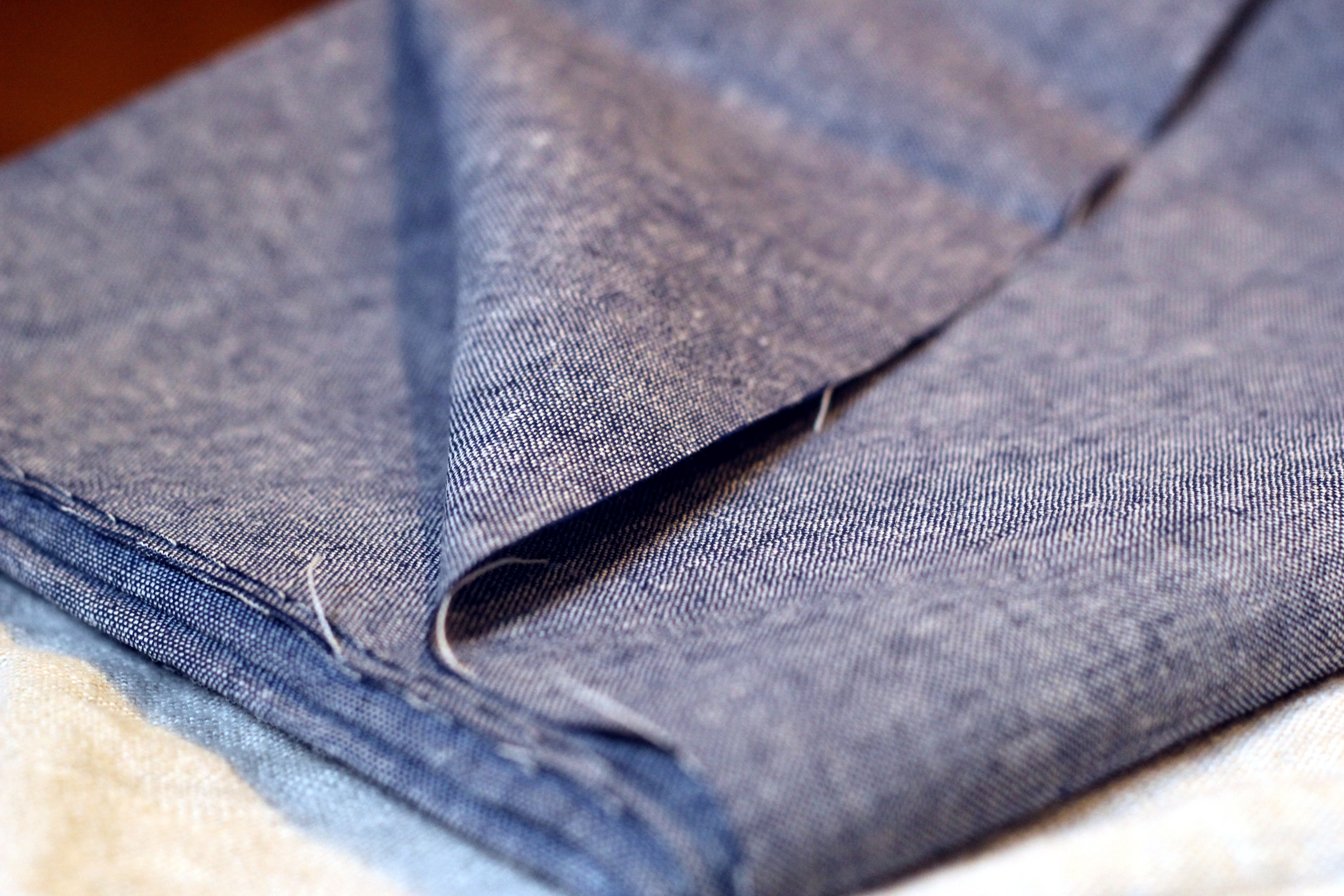
A blue chambray fabric, made of a blend of linen and cotton, with blue warp and white filling

Cambric was originally a kind of fine, white, plain-weave linen cloth made at or near Cambrai. The word comes from Kameryk or Kamerijk, the Flemish name of Cambrai, which became part of France in 1677. The word is attested since 1530. It is a synonym of the French word batiste, itself attested since 1590. Batiste itself comes from the Picard batiche, attested since 1401 and derived from the old French battre for bowing wool. The modern form batiste, or baptiste, comes from a popular merge with the surname Baptiste, pronounced Batisse, as indicated by the use of the expressions thoile batiche (1499) and toile de baptiste (1536) for the same fabric. The alleged invention of the fabric, around 1300, by a weaver called Baptiste or Jean-Baptiste Cambray or Chambray, from the village of Castaing in the peerage of Marcoing, near Cambrai, has no historic ground. Cambric was a finer quality and more expensive than lawn (from the French laune, initially a plain-weave linen fabric from the city of Laon in France). Denoting a geographic origin from the city of Cambrai or its surroundings (Cambresis in French), cambric is an exact equivalent of the French cambrésine (/kɑ̃.bʁe.zin/), a very fine, almost sheer white linen plain-weave fabric, to be distinguished from cambrasine, a fabric comparable to the French lawn despite its foreign origin.

Cambric is also similar to chambray (/ˈʃɒmbreɪ/) from a French regional variant of "Cambrai", a name which "also comes from Cambrai, the French city, where the material was originally made of linen yarn". Chambray (also spelled "chambrai") appears in North American English in the early 19th century. Though the term generally refers to a cotton plain weave with a coloured warp and a white weft, close to gingham, "silk chambray" seems to have coexisted. Chambray was often produced during this period by the same weavers producing gingham.

White linen cambric or batiste from Cambrai, noted for its weight and lustre, was "preferred for ecclesiastical wear, fine shirts, underwear, shirt frills, cravats, collars and cuffs, handkerchiefs, and infant wear". Technical use sometime introduced a difference between cambric and batiste, the latter being of a lighter weight and a finer thread count.

In the 18th century, after the prohibition of imports into England of French cambrics, with the development of the import of Indian cotton fabrics, similar cotton fabrics, such as nainsook, from the Hindi nainsukh ("eyes' delight"), became popular. These fabrics, initially called Scotch cambrics to distinguish them from the original French cambrics, came to be referred to as cotton cambrics or batistes. Some authors increased the confusion with the assumption the word batiste could come from the Indian fabric bastas.

In the 19th century, the terms cambric and batiste gradually lost their association with linen, implying only different kinds of fine plain-weave fabrics with a glossy finish. In 1907, a fine cotton batiste had 100 ends per inch in the finished fabric, while a cheap-grade, less than 60. At the same time, with development of an interest in coloured shirts, cambric was also woven in colours, such as the pink fabric used by Charvet for a corsage, reducing the difference between cambric and chambray. Moreover, the development and rationalization of mechanical weaving led to the replacement, for chambray, of coloured warp and white weft by the opposite, white warp and coloured weft, which allowed for longer warps.

== See also ==
- Gingham – Type of fabric
- Lawn – Fine plain weave cloth, originally of linen, now usually of cotton
- Nainsook – Soft, lightweight, plain-woven cotton fabric
