= Jhuna =

Fine, sheer fabric produced in Bengal

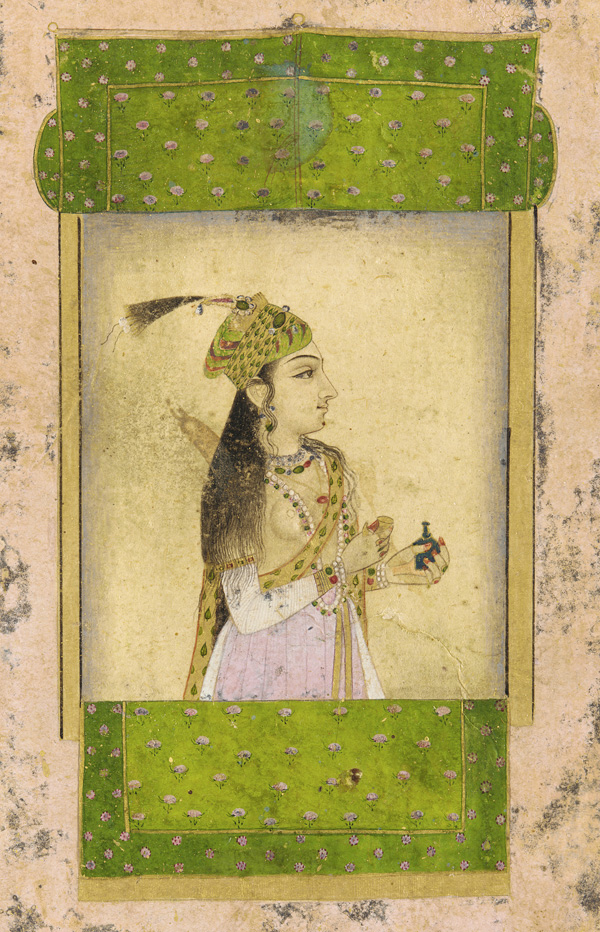
A noble lady, Mughal dynasty, India. 17th century, in sheer dress

Jhuna was a fine sheer fabric, an open-weave structure similar to gauze. Jhuna was used primarily in the dresses of the dancers. It was another kind of fine muslin produced in Bengal with other peers such as Buddun khas, kumees, Rang.

== Name ==
Jhuna is a derivation word of jhin That means fine and thin.

== Dimensions ==
Jhuna was produced in pieces with the dimensions, 20 yards of length, and one-yard width.

== Exports ==
Unlike other muslins, exports of Jhuna were forbidden.

== Use ==
Jhuna was purposefully produced for the use of wealthy women households as well as the clothing of dancers and singers.

== See also ==
- Mulboos khas
