= Seerhand muslin =

Kind of muslin cloth

Seerhand muslin (Seerhand) was a plain weave thin cotton fabric produced in the Indian subcontinent.

== Texture ==
Seerhand was a kind of muslin cloth. It has a texture in between nainsook and mull (another muslin type, a very thin and soft). The fabric was resistant to washing, retaining its clearness.

== Use ==
Seerhand was used in dresses.
