= Lawn cloth =

Fine plain weave cloth, originally of linen, now usually of cotton

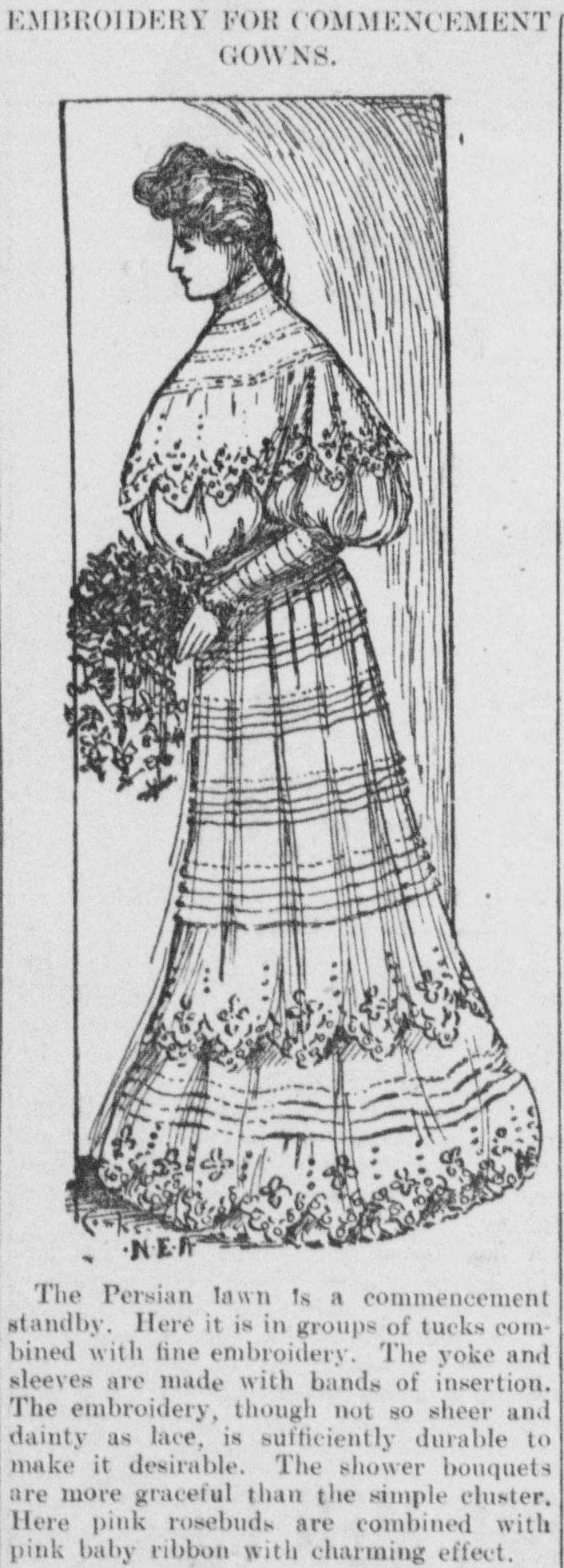
Commencement gown made from lawn cloth, 1904 illustration

Lawn cloth or lawn is a fine plain weave textile, made with fine combed cotton. Terms also used include batiste and nainsook. Originally the name applied to plain weave linen, and linen lawn is also called "handkerchief linen". The term lawn is also used in the textile industry to refer to a type of starched crisp finish given to a cloth product. The finish can be applied to a variety of fine fabrics, prints or plain.

== Characteristics ==
Lawn is a lightweight, sheer cloth, crisper than voile but not as crisp as organza. Lawn is known for its semi-transparency, which can range from gauzy or sheer to an almost opaque effect, known as lining or utility lawn. The finish used on lawn ranges from soft to semi-crisp to crisp, but the fabric is never completely stiff. Lawn can be white, or may be dyed or printed.

Lawn is designed using fine, high-thread-count yarns, which results in a silky, untextured feel. The fabric is made using either combed or carded yarns. When lawn is made using combed yarns, with a soft feel and slight luster, it is known as nainsook.

== History ==
The term "lawn" derives from "Laon", a city in France, which produced linen lawn. Cotton lawn rose in popularity due to its breathable characteristics in warmer climates particularly during the period of British rule in India and Pakistan.

== Uses ==
Lawn cloth commonly is used for infant wear, handkerchiefs, dresses, blouses, aprons and curtains. Other uses are nightwear, underwear, lingerie, collar cuffs and shirting. It is also commonly used in vestments in Anglican churches, such as the surplice and episcopal rochet.

Lawn is a very popular fabric in Pakistan, with new fabrics released from February each year. In 2016, lawn cotton was worth $500 million to the Pakistani textile industry and employs more than 30,000 people.

== See also ==
- Textile manufacturing
