= Muslin =

Cotton fabric of fine plain weave

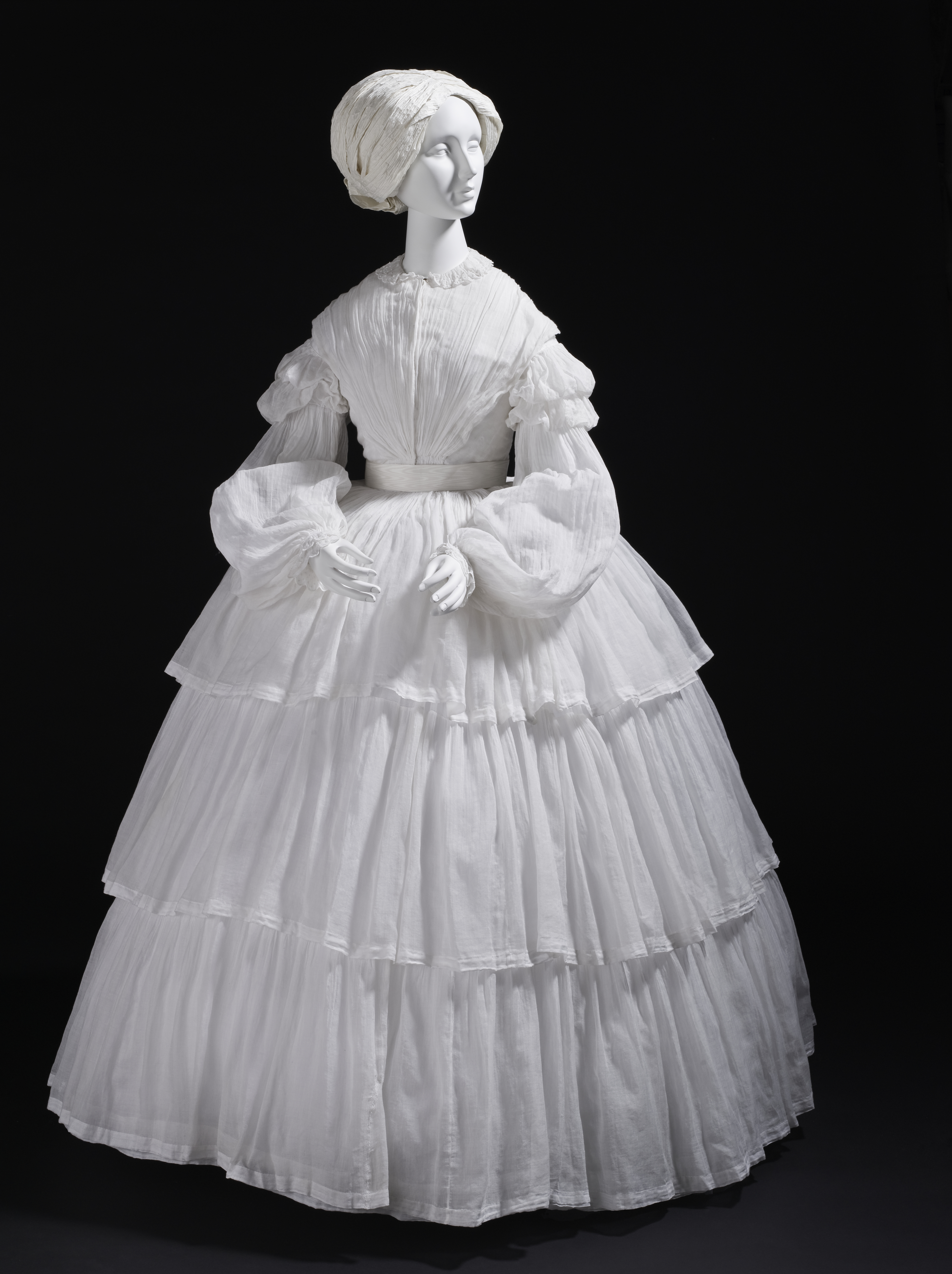
Woman's white muslin dress with tiered flounces, Europe, c. 1855

Muslin (/ˈmʌzlɪn/) is a cotton fabric of plain weave. It is made in a wide range of weights from delicate sheers to coarse sheeting.

Muslin was produced in different regions of South Asia; the Bengal region was the main manufacturing area. While there were several cotton production centers in Bengal, the cloth produced in Sonargaon, 15 miles from east of Dhaka, was of the highest quality in the subcontinent. As Dhaka became the capital of Mughal Bengal following its conquest by the Mughals, the Muslin produced around Dhaka became more accessible to distant markets, including Central Asia where fine muslin was known as "Daka". The muslin produced at Dhaka, Sonargaon and its surrounding areas was of excellent quality, which is popularly known as Dhaka muslin. Muslin was made in Dhaka (Sonargaon) from very fine yarn, which is made from a cotton called phuti carpus, endemic to Bangladesh. A minimum of 300-count yarn was used for the muslin, making the muslin as transparent as glass. There were about 28 varieties of muslin, of which jamdani is still widely used. During the 17th and 18th centuries, Mughal Bengal emerged as the foremost muslin exporter in the world, with Dhaka as capital of the worldwide muslin trade. In the latter half of the 18th century, muslin weaving ceased in Bengal due to cheap fabrics from England.

In India in the latter half of the 20th century and in Bangladesh in the second decade of the 21st century, initiatives were taken to revive muslin weaving, and the industry was revived. Dhakai Muslin was recognized as a Geographical Indication (GI) product of Bangladesh in 2020 and Banglar Muslin (Bengal Muslin) was recognized as a Geographical Indication (GI) product of the Indian state of West Bengal in 2024. In 2013, Jamdani (a type of muslin) weaving art of Bangladesh included in the list of Masterpieces of the Oral and Intangible Heritage of Humanity by UNESCO under the title Traditional art of Jamdani Weaving.

== Etymology ==
It is commonly believed that it gets its name from the city of Mosul, Iraq. The dictionary Hobson Jobson published by two Englishmen named S. C. Burnell and Henry Yule mentions that the word muslin comes from 'Mosul'—a famous trading center and city in Iraq. Mosul produced a very fine cloth, which became known as muslin in Europe.

Some scholars suggest the name may have derived from Masulipatnam, India. Masulipatnam (modern Machilipatnam, Andhra Pradesh) is a prominent port town on the Coromandel Coast of India that was a major center for cotton textile production and export from the early medieval period. Masulipatnam was well known to Arab, Persian, and later European traders—particularly the Portuguese, Dutch, and English—for its fine cotton fabrics, including lightweight plain-woven cloths comparable to what later came to be called muslin in Europe. Some scholars have suggested that European merchants may have derived the term muslin from the name of this port, in a manner similar to other textlile names such as calico (from Calicut) and denim (from de Nîmes), reflecting a common practice of naming fabrics after their principal places of trade rather than their sites of manufacture.

== History ==
=== Early period ===
A medieval Indian kingdom called 'Ruhma' is found in the writings of Sulaiman al-Tajir, a 9th century Arab merchant who visited Bengal under the Pala Empire. He described it as a place where fine cotton fabric was produced. There were cotton fabrics so fine and delicate that a single piece of cloth could be easily moved through the ring.

Very fine cotton cloth was made in Mosul in the 12th century and later. Arab traders carried it to Europe as a commodity, and enchanted Europeans called it muslin.

In 1298 AD, Marco Polo described in his book The Travels that muslin is made in Mosul, Iraq. Ibn Battuta, a Moroccan traveler who came to Bengal in the middle of the 14th century, praised the cotton cloth made in Sonargaon in his book The Rihla. Chinese writers who came to Bengal in the fifteenth century praised its cotton cloth.

=== Mughal period ===
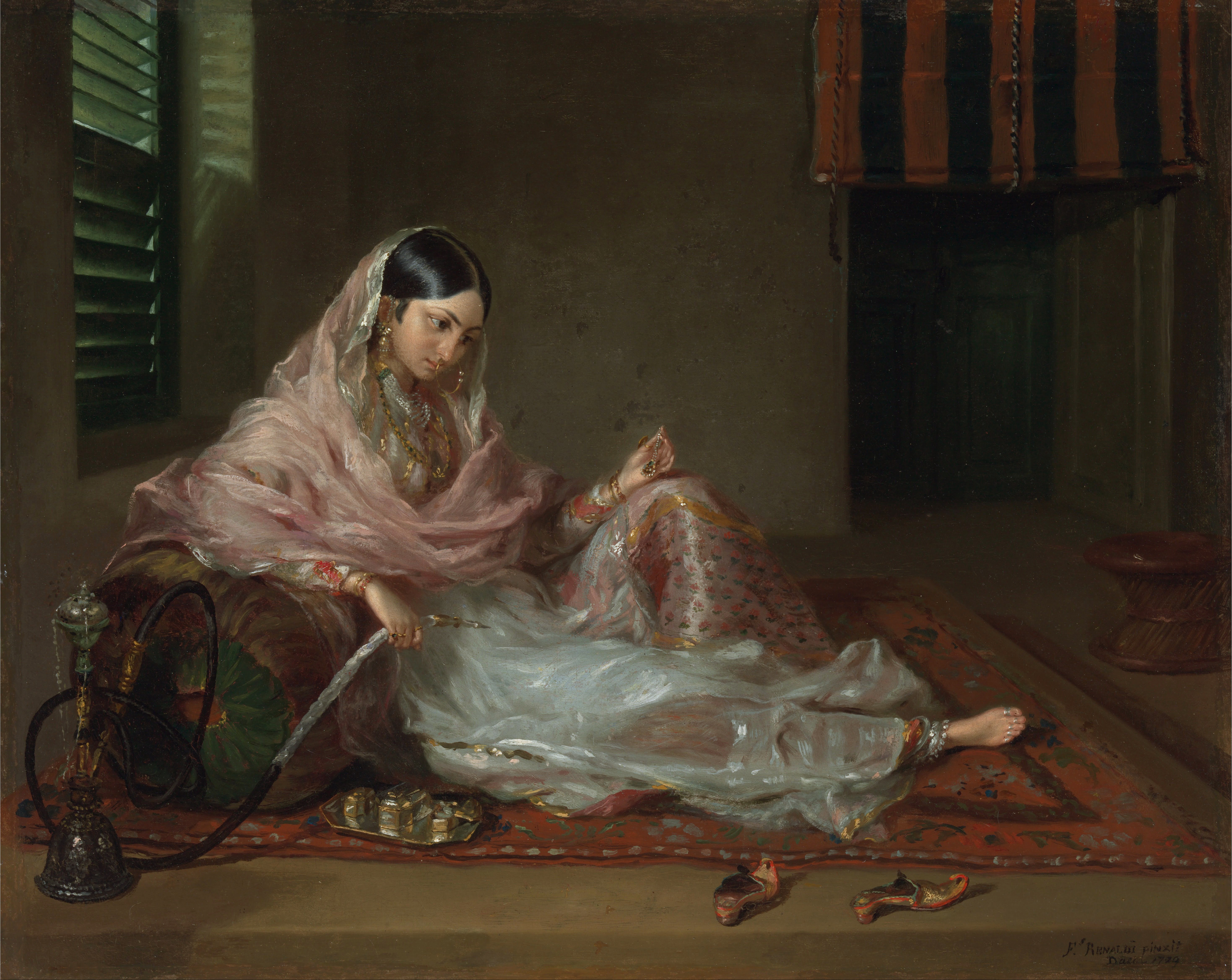
A woman in Bengal wearing Dhaka muslin, titled Muslim Lady Reclining by Francesco Renaldi (1789)

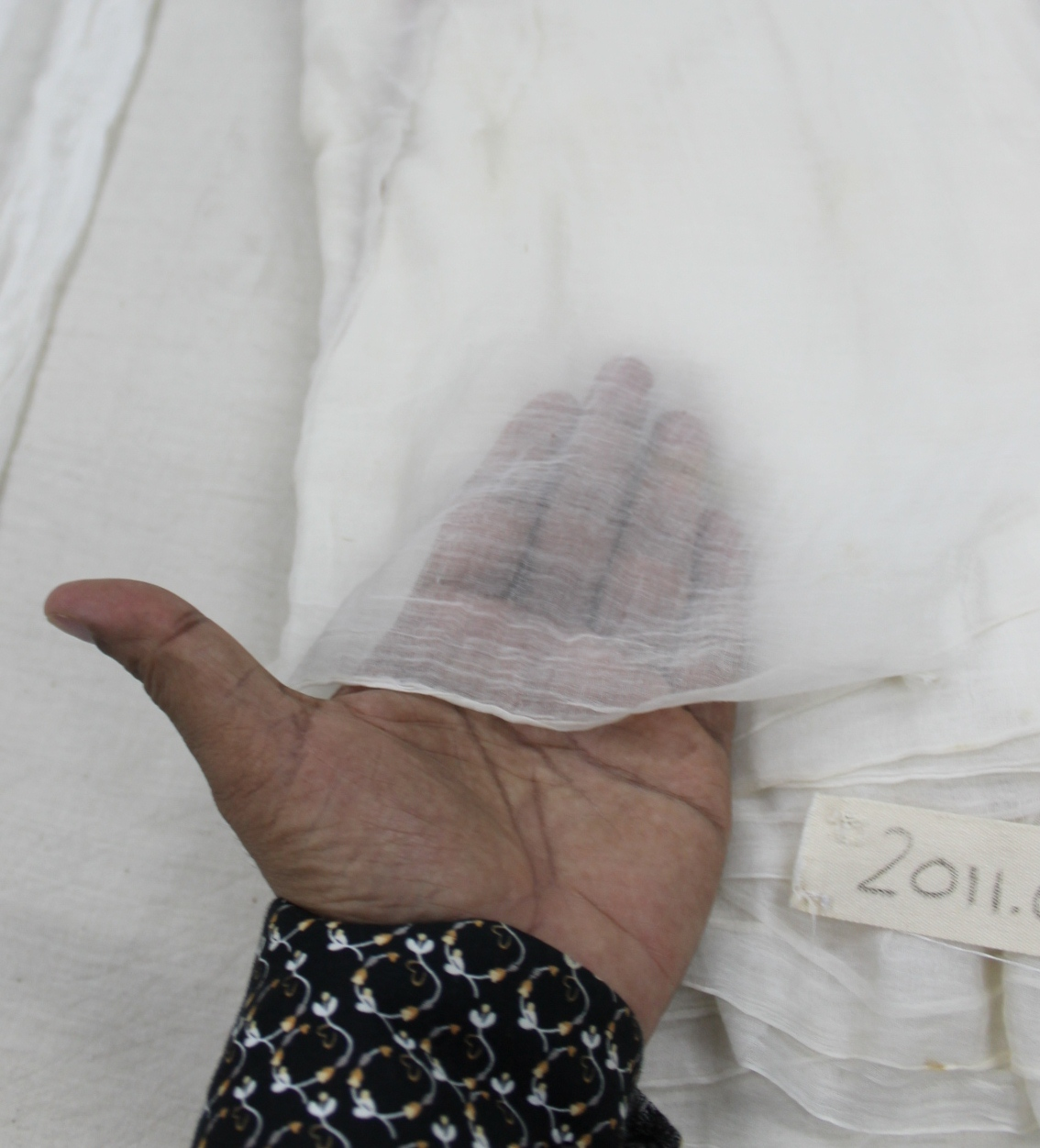
In 2015, the diaphanous quality of muslin woven at Sonargaon in the 18th century is being tested in Kolkata.

The muslin industry flourished in Bengal between the sixteenth and eighteenth centuries. The main muslin production centers in Bengal during this period were Dhaka and its surrounding areas. The 16th-century English traveller Ralph Fitch lauded the muslin he saw in Sonargaon. He visited India in 1583, described Sonargaon, "as a town ... where there is the best and finest cloth made in all India". During the reign of Mughal Emperor Jahangir, Islam Khan Chishti shifted the capital from Rajmahal to Dhaka in 1610 AD, Dhaka gained prominence as the center of trade and commerce of Bengal. During this period the muslin produced in Dhaka achieved excellence, and the muslin produced here became world famous as Dhaka muslin. Mughal Emperor Akbar's courtier, Abul Fazal, praised the fine cotton fabric produced in Sonargaon (near Dhaka). Abul Fazl wrote "the Sarkar of Sonargaon produces a species of muslin very fine and in great quantity". European traders began arriving in the Bengali capital of Dhaka in the early 17th-century, and these traders procured cotton cloth and muslin from Bengal for export to Europe.

During the 17th and 18th-centuries, Mughal Bengal emerged as the foremost muslin exporter in the world, with Mughal Dhaka as capital of the worldwide muslin trade. It became highly popular in 18th-century France and eventually spread across much of the Western world. Dhaka muslin was first showcased in the UK at The Great Exhibition of the Works of Industry of All Nations in 1851.

=== Decline under Company rule ===
During the period of Company rule, the East India Company imported British-produced cloth into the Indian subcontinent, but became unable to compete with the local muslin industry. The Company administration initiated several policies in an attempt to suppress the muslin industry, and muslin production subsequently experienced a period of decline. It has been alleged that in some instances Indian weavers were rounded up and their thumbs chopped off, although this has been refuted by historians as a misreading of a report by William Bolts from 1772. Many of the threatened weavers fled East Bengal and settled in the eastern districts of West Bengal, these districts were famous for the cotton products of Bengal. The quality, fineness and production volume of Bengali muslin declined as a result of these policies, continuing when India transitioned from Company rule to British Crown control.

=== Revive: 1950s–present ===
==== Bangladesh ====
In the second decade of the 21st century, a scheme called Bangladesh Golden Heritage Muslin Yarn Manufacturing Technology and Muslin Cloth Restoration was undertaken to restore and develop the muslin production system in Bangladesh. Under this project, samples of muslin from different countries including India and Britain were inspected and data collected. Old maps of the Meghna River were examined and combined with modern satellite imagery to identify possible locations – where phuti carpus plants could still be found. From there, the genetic sequences of the recovered cotton plants were made and compared with the original ones. After testing, a carpus plant was identified, which was 70 percent identical to the phuti carpus. An island in the Meghna, 30 km north of Dhaka, was selected for the production of this carpus, where some seeds were sown experimentally in 2015, and the first cotton was harvested that year. But at that time there were no skilled spinners in Bangladesh to produce fine yarn. On the other hand, Indian spinners were able to produce 200-300-400-500 count fine yarn from cotton. As a result, in a joint venture with Indian spinners, a hybrid yarn of 200 and 300 count was produced by combining common and phuti carpus cotton. At least 50 tools were needed to make cloth from yarn, which had to be reinvented, as they disappeared with muslin. Ultimately, a weaver is able to weave a sari with a thread count of 300, which is nowhere near the quality of real Dhaka muslin; But much better quality than what the weavers of many generations past have woven.

The Bangladesh Handloom Board (BHB) is implementing the first phase of the project titled Bangladesh's Golden Heritage Muslin Yarn Manufacturing Technology and Muslin Cloth Reviving, and the Revival work was completed in 2020. Dhakai Muslin was recognized as a GI (Geographical Indication) product on 28 December 2020. The Government of Bangladesh declared the official revival of fine Dhaka Muslin in April 2022.

In 2022, the Dhakai Muslin House was built on the banks of Shitalakshya river at Rupganj under Tarab municipality of Narayanganj district. The second phase of the project named Dhaka Muslin Commercialization began in 2023.

The Dhakai Muslin (21st century)

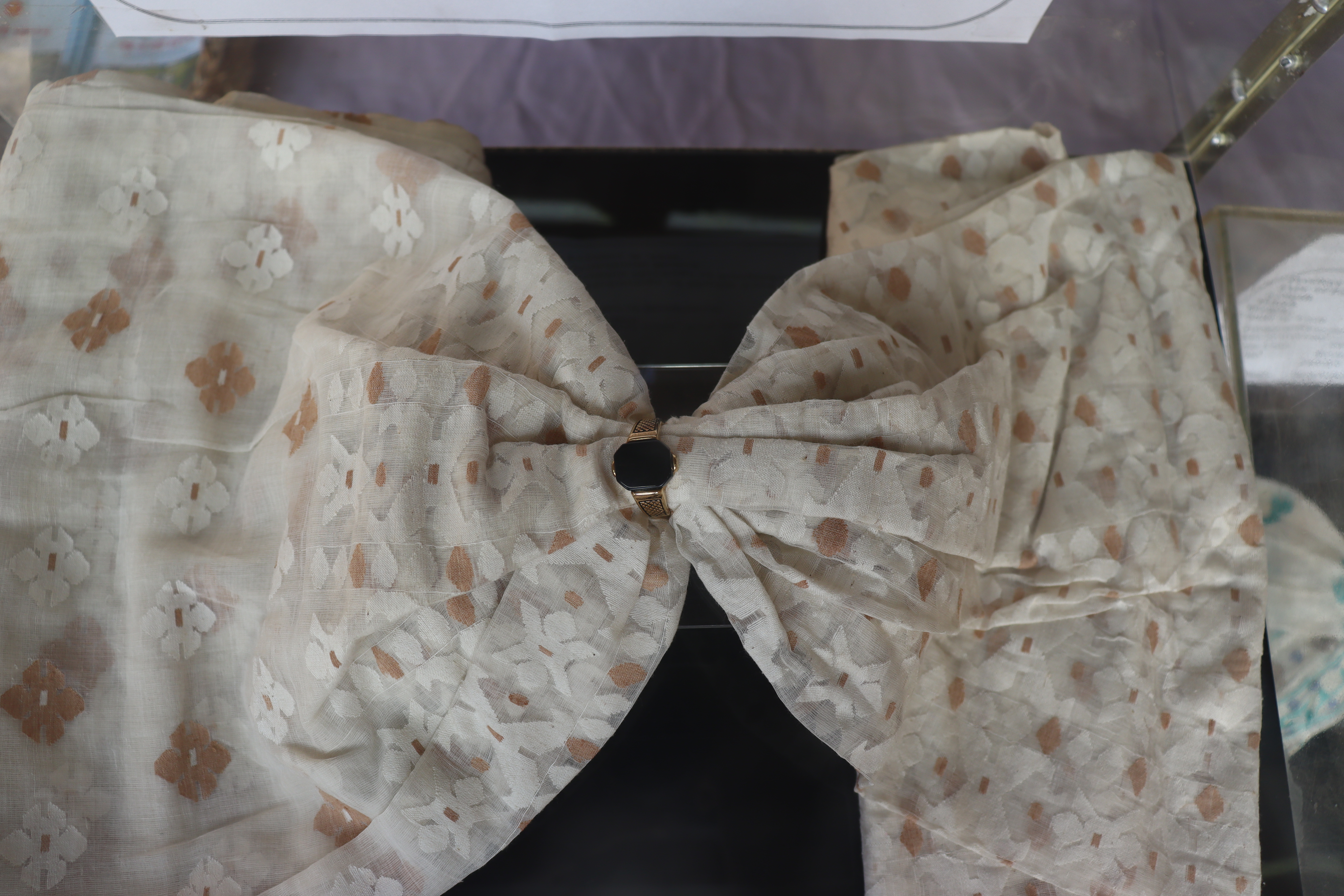
A Dhaka muslin sari, produced by Bangladesh Handloom Board under the project "Bangladesh Muslin Golden Heritage of Technology Reviving the Technology of Muslin Golden Heritage"

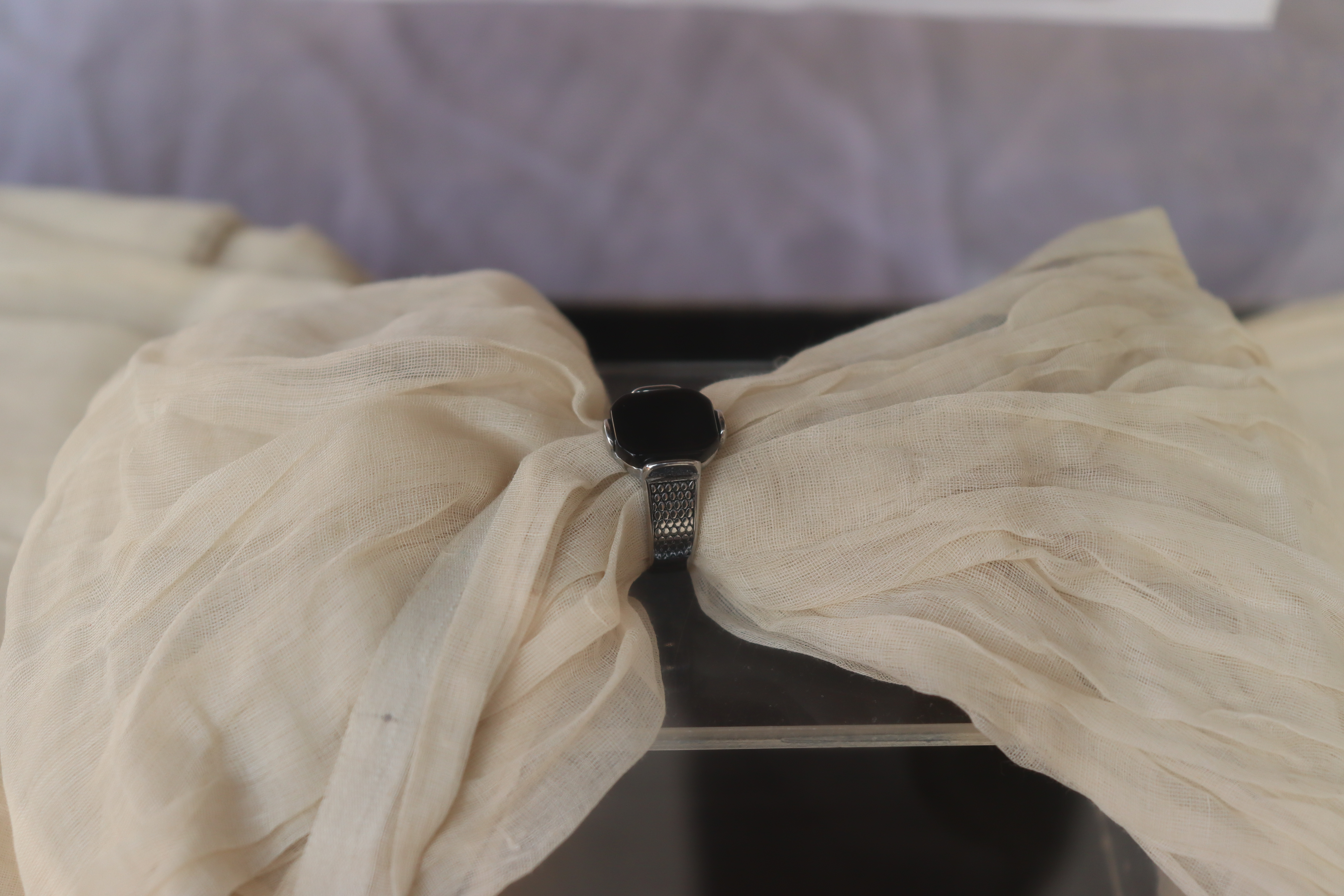
Dhaka muslin fabric

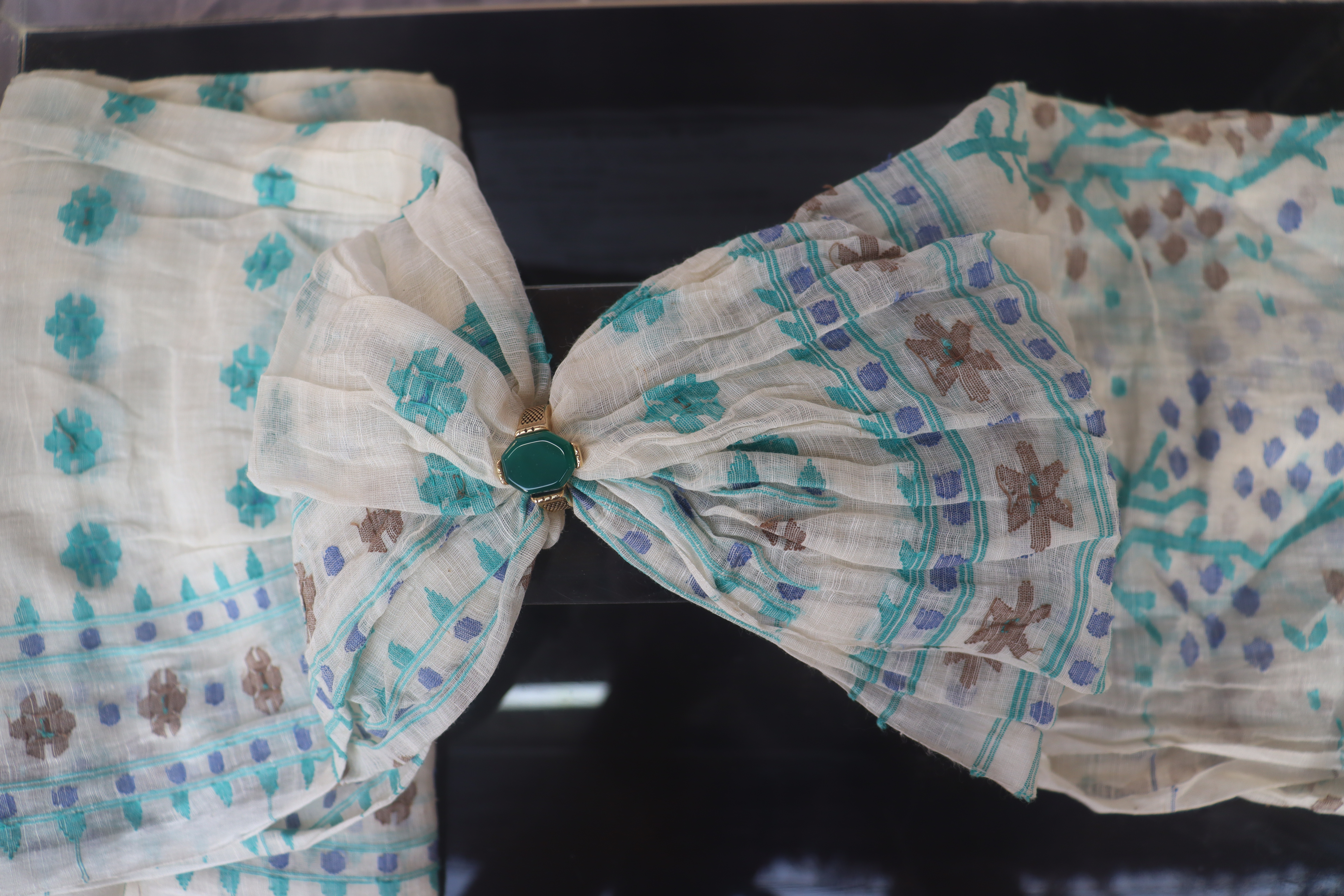
A scarf of Dhaka muslin, woven with 300 count yarn

==== India ====
To revive Bengal muslin, two muslin production centers were set up by the Khadi and Rural Industries Commission, one at Basowa in Birbhum district of West Bengal, and the other at Panduru in Srikakulam district of Andhra Pradesh. Under the patronage of former Prime Minister Jawaharlal Nehru, Kalicharan Sharma took the lead in reviving the lost fame of muslin in Basowa with the help of some spinners. He soon found the dry climate of Birbhum quite unsuitable for spinning muslin yarn. Later he shifted his work center to the neighboring district of Murshidabad, and chose Chowk Islampur as the site of this weaving industry. Chowk Islampur, situated on the banks of the Bairab River, a tributary of the Padma, is an ancient village famous for spinning and weaving since the days of the East India Company. After India's independence, the village had already gained a reputation for high-quality silk weaving. A muslin training center was started at Chowk Islampur in 1955 under the supervision of Kalicharan Sharma.

At first experiments were started on spinning yarn with traditional Kishan Charkha, but it was not possible to make more than 250 counts on this traditional charkha (spinning wheel). Kalicharan Sharma did further experiments and research and developed a highly sensitive six spindle Ambar Charkha capable of spinning 500 count yarn. This new Charkha was able to reduce the cost of production and increase the wages of spinners. The use of this Ambar Charkha proved to be effective and promising for the regeneration of muslin. To concentrate on muslin spinning, the Khadi Society constructed a separate spacious two-storied building at Berhampore in 1966.

The Government of West Bengal launched "Project Muslin" in 2013 with Khadi. The aim in this initiative was to revive the muslin fabric and support the weavers. Through this project, weavers from Murshidabad, Nadia, Maldah, Burdwan, Birbhum, Hooghly and Jhargram districts who are capable of weaving muslin cloth were identified. All these weavers are provided training and technical assistance to produce high quality muslin. Weavers are capable of producing 500 counts of muslin; Some weavers have been able to weave 700 count muslin. Project Muslin was able to expand the production of muslin in different parts of West Bengal. Muslin products produced in West Bengal include handkerchiefs, dhoti, bed sheets and men's and women's clothing. According to 2015 data, the products were priced between ₹400 and ₹25,000, while some premium sarees in this category were priced between ₹70,000 and ₹150,000.

The Bengal Muslin (20th century)

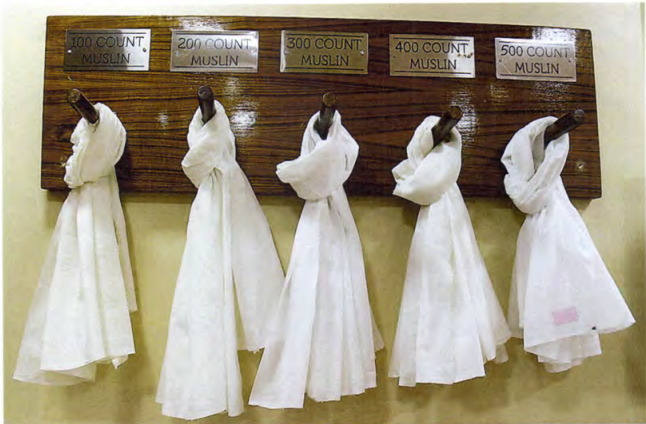
Display of Bengal muslin fabrics, which are woven from 100 count to 500 count yarns

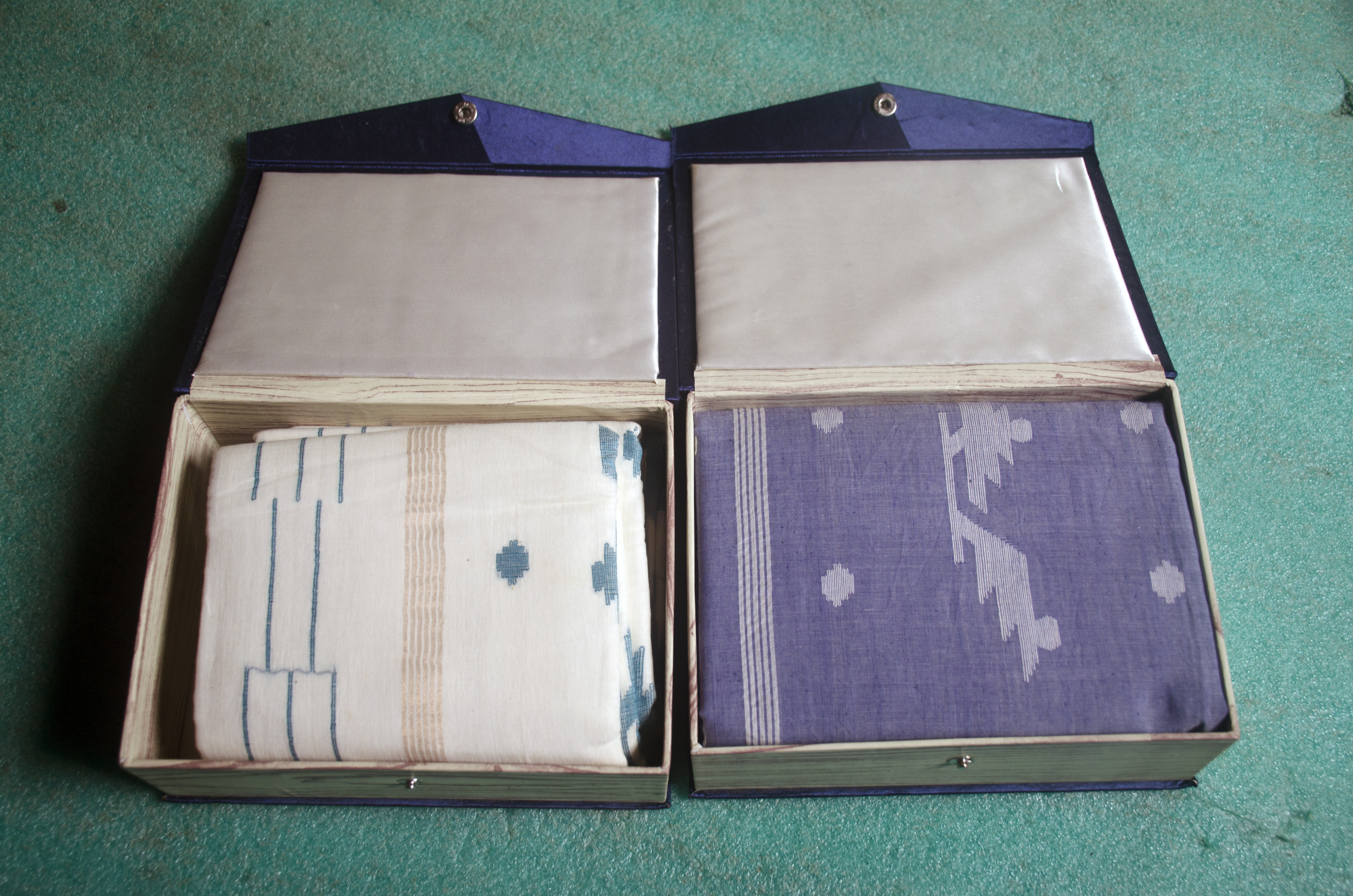
Two muslin sarees packaged in two small cardboard boxes of size approx 8 inches X 6 inches X 2 inches

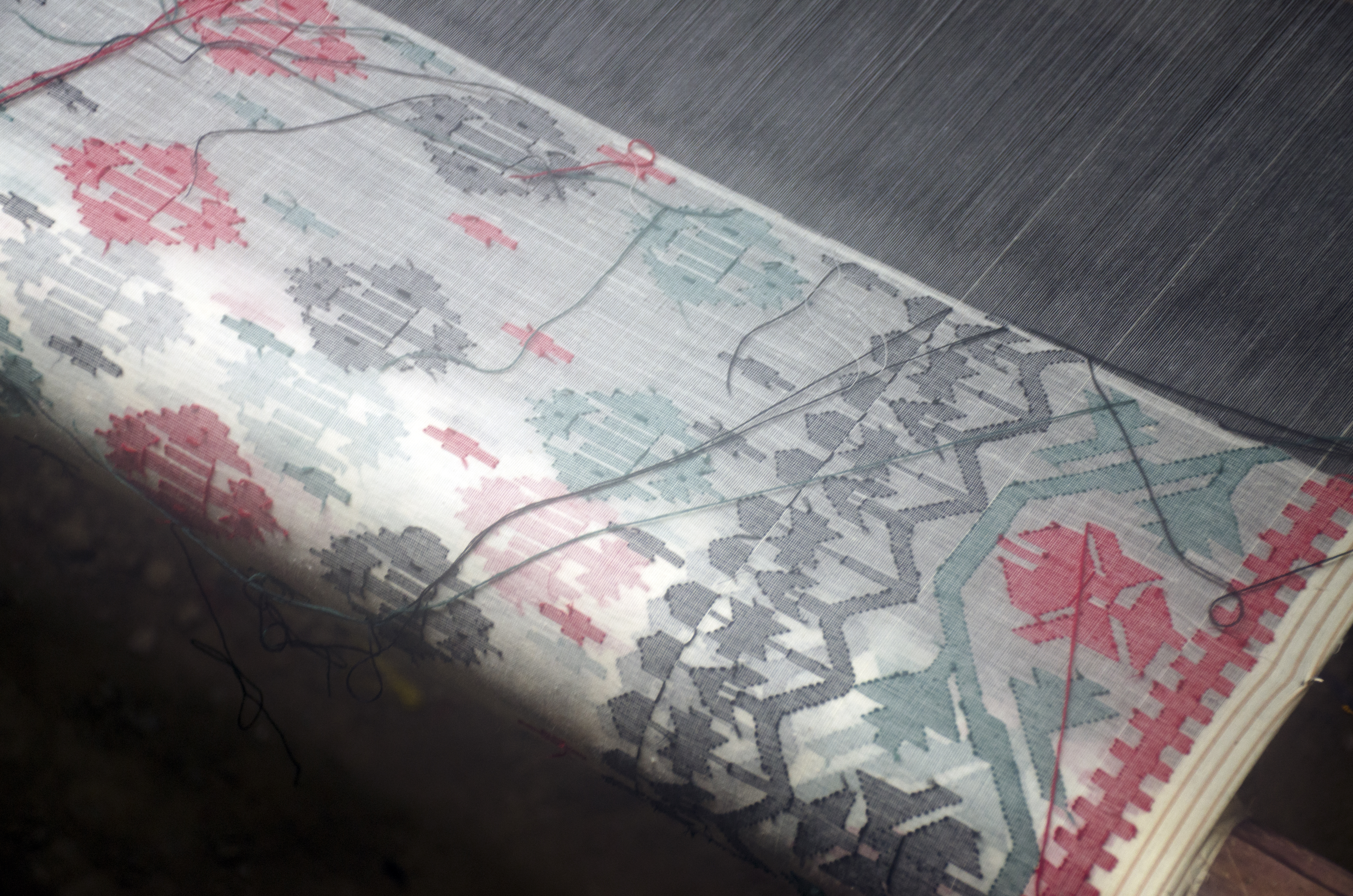
Muslin saree weaving in Kalna, West Bengal

== Manufacturing process ==
Since all the processes were manual, manufacturing involved many artisans for yarn spinning and weaving activities, but the leading role lay with the material and weaving.

- Ginning: For removing trash and cleaning and combing the fibers and making them parallel ready for spinning a boalee (upper jaw of a catfish) was used.
- Spinning and weaving: For extra humidity they used to weave during the rainy season for elasticity in the yarns and to avoid breakages. The process was so sluggish that it could take over five months to weave one piece of muslin.

== Characteristics ==
=== Thin ===
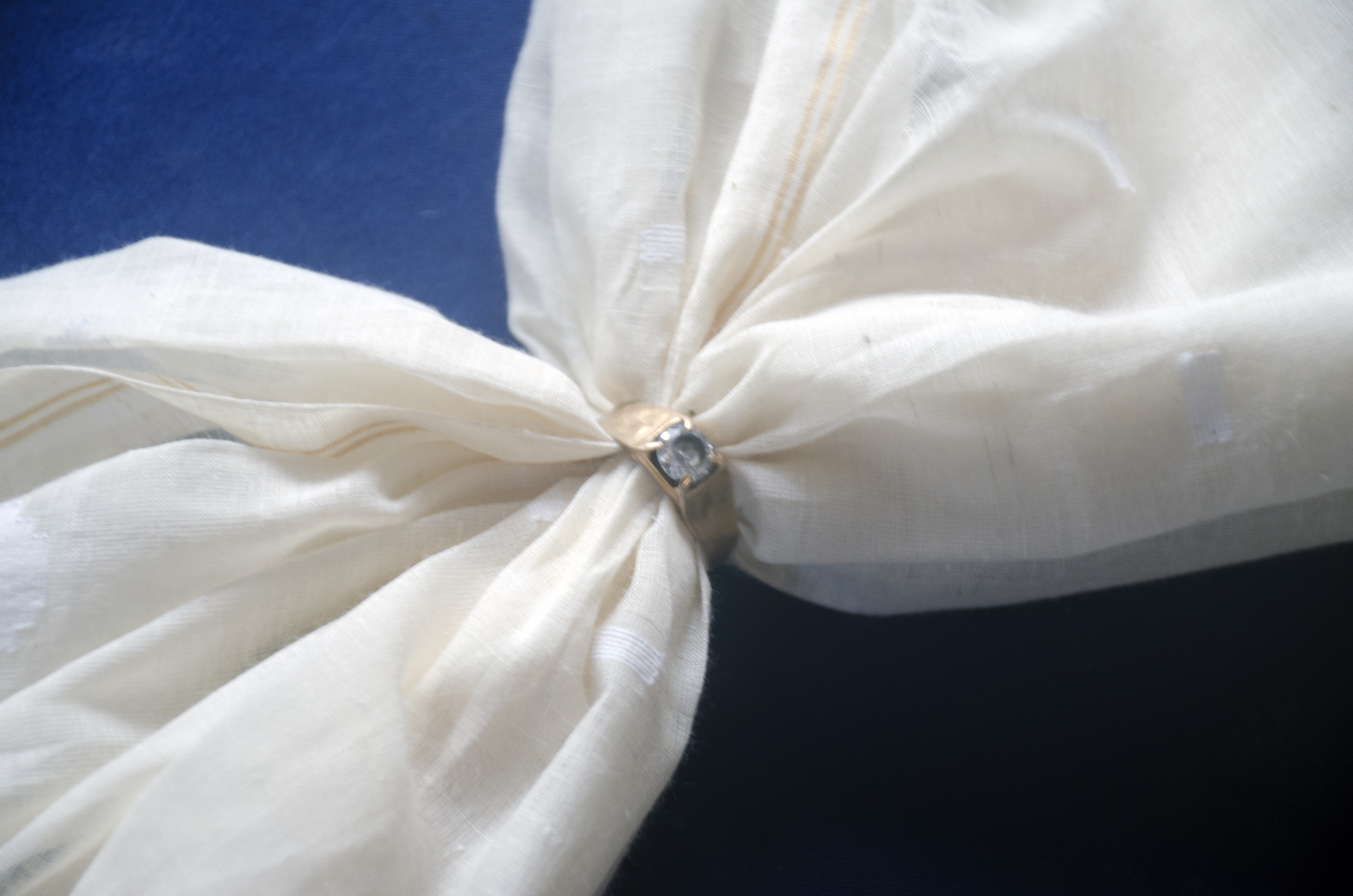
Muslin saree passing through a ring

Muslins were originally made of cotton only. These were very thin, transparent, delicate and feather light breathable fabrics. There could be 1000–1800 yarns in warp and weigh 110 g (3.8 oz) for 0.91 m × 9.14 m (1 yd × 10 yd). Some varieties of muslin were so thin that they could even pass through the aperture of a lady's finger-ring.

=== Transparency ===
Gaius Petronius Arbiter (1st century AD Roman courtier and author of the Satyricon) described the transparent nature of the muslin cloth as below:

Thy bride might as well clothe herself with a garment of the wind as stand forth publicly naked under her clouds of muslin.

— Petronius

=== Poetic names ===
Certain delicate muslins were given poetic names such as baft hawa ("woven air"), shabnam ("morning dew"), and āb-i-ravān ("flowing water"). The latter name refers to a fine and transparent variety of fine muslin from Dhaka. The fabric's characteristics are summed up in its name.

=== Types ===
Muslin has several kinds of variations. Many of the below are mentioned in Ain-i-Akbari (16th-century detailed document):

- Khasa
- Tansukh
- Nainsook
- Chautar
- Alliballi, the name embraces ā'lā, 'superior', bhalā, 'good'.
- Adatais, a fine and clear fabric.
- Seerhand muslin, a variety in between nainsook and mull (another muslin type, very thin and soft). The fabric was resistant to washing, retaining its clearness.
- Varieties of mulmul (mulboos khas, jhuna, sarkar ali, sarbati, tarindam) were among the most delicate cotton muslins produced in the Indian subcontinent.

==== More variations ====
Mull is another kind of muslin. It is a soft, thin, and semitransparent material. The name is derived from Hindi "mal" which means "soft". Swiss mull is a type of which is finished with stiffening agents.

== Uses ==
=== Dressmaking and sewing ===
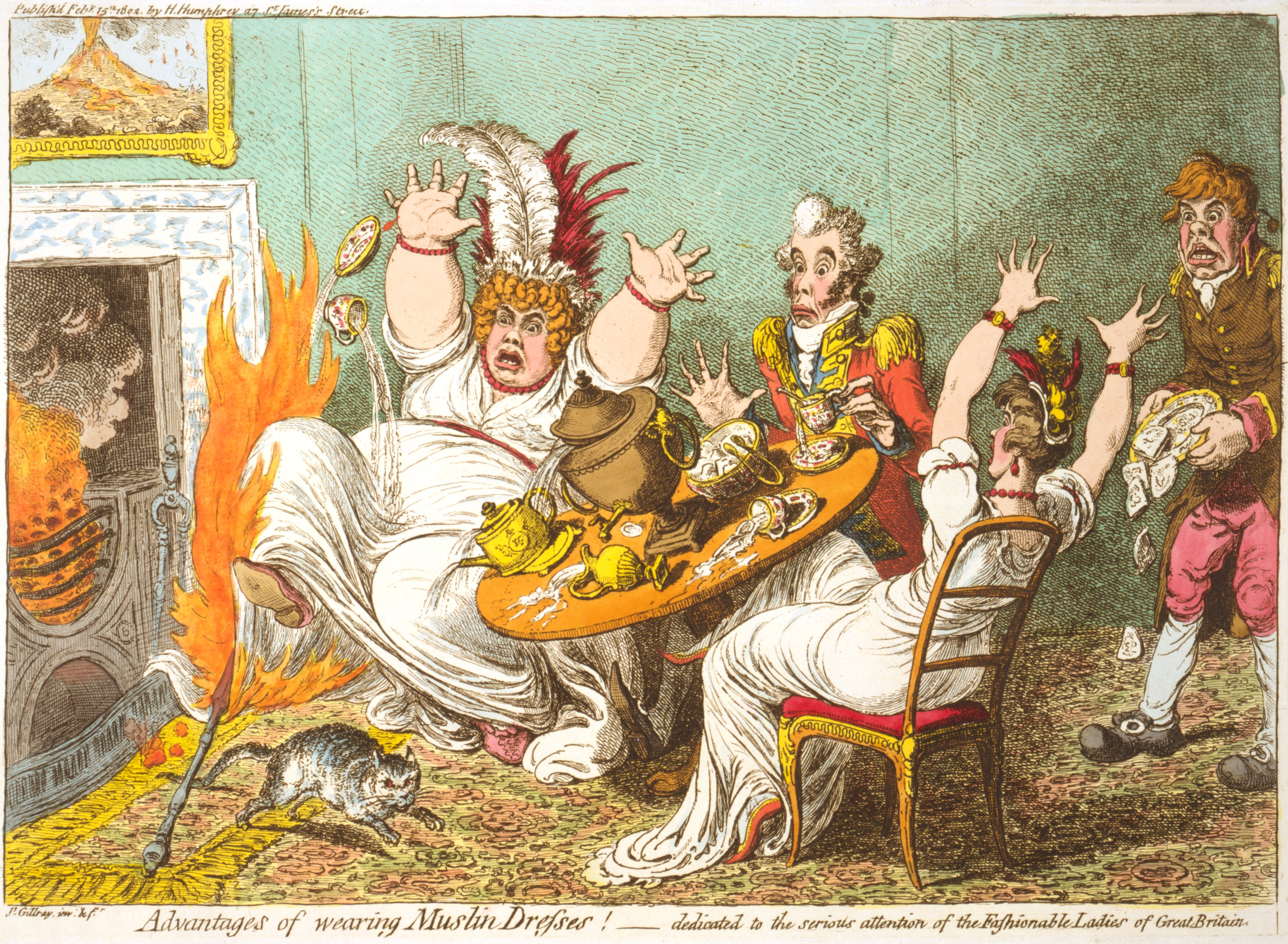
In Advantages of wearing Muslin Dresses! (1802), James Gillray satirically pointed out a hazard of untreated muslin: its flammability.

Because muslin is an inexpensive, unbleached cotton fabric available in different weights, it is often used as a backing or lining for quilts, and therefore can often be found in wide widths in the quilting sections of fabric stores.

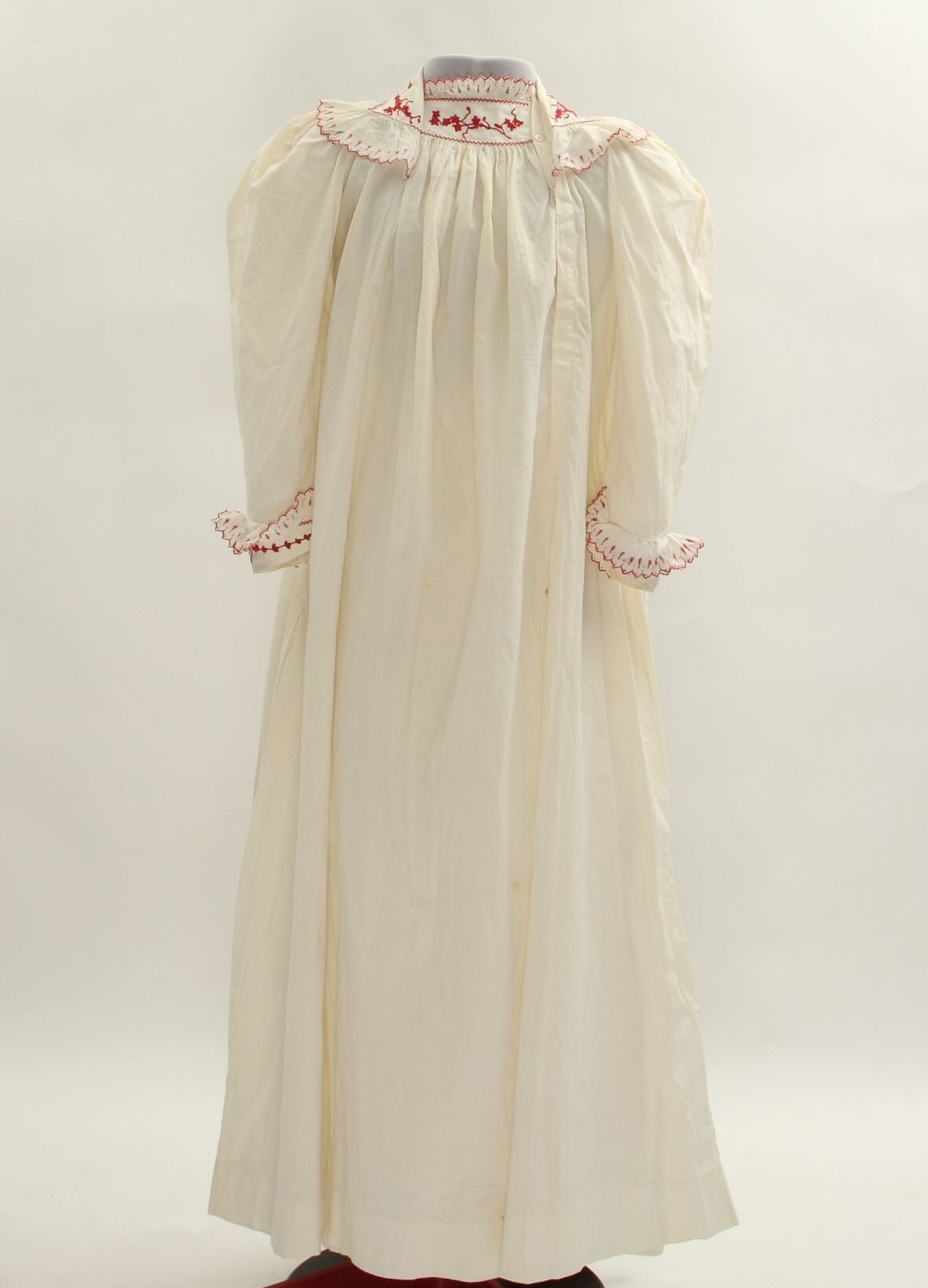
White muslin nightgown

When sewing clothing, a dressmaker may test the fit of a garment by using muslin fabric to make a test-model before cutting pieces from more expensive fabric to make the final product, thereby avoiding potential costly mistakes. In the United States, these test-models are themselves sometimes referred to as "muslins", the process is called "making a muslin", and "muslin" has become the generic term for any test- or fitting garment, regardless of the fabric it is made from.

In Britain and Australia, the term for a test- or fitting garment used to be toile. The word "toile", from an Old French word for "cloth", entered the English language around the 12th century. Today, toile simply refers to any sheer fabric, which may be made, for example, from linen or cotton. The modern German term for a test- or fitting garment is Nesselmodell.

In fashion design, muslin is commonly used to create test garments (also known as mock-ups or toiles) before final production, allowing designers to evaluate fit, proportions, and construction details before cutting into final fabric.

=== Use in food production ===
Muslin can be used as a filter:

- In a funnel when decanting fine wine or port to prevent sediment from entering the decanter
- To separate liquid from mush (for example, to make apple juice: wash, chop, boil, mash, then filter by pouring the mush into a muslin bag suspended over a jug)
- To retain a liquidy solid (for example, in home cheese-making, when the milk has curdled to a gel, pour into a muslin bag and squash between two saucers (upside down under a brick) to squeeze out the liquid whey from the cheese curd)
- Muslin is a filter in traditional Fijian kava production.

Muslin is the material for the traditional cloth wrapped around a Christmas pudding. It is the fabric wrapped around the items in barmbrack, a fruitcake traditionally eaten at Halloween in Ireland. Beekeepers use muslin to filter melted beeswax to clean it of particles and debris.

=== Set design and photography ===
Muslin is often the cloth of choice for theatre sets. It is used to mask the background of sets and to establish the mood or feel of different scenes. It receives paint well and, if treated properly, can be made translucent.

It also holds dyes well. It is often used to create nighttime scenes because when dyed, it often gets a wavy look with the color varying slightly, such that it resembles a night sky. Muslin shrinks after it is painted or sprayed with water, which is desirable in some common techniques such as soft-covered flats.

In video production, muslin is used as a cheap greenscreen or bluescreen, either pre-colored or painted with latex paint (diluted with water).

Muslin is the most common backdrop material used by photographers for formal portrait backgrounds. These backdrops are usually painted, most often with an abstract mottled pattern.

In the early days of silent film-making, and until the late 1910s, movie studios did not have the elaborate lights needed to illuminate indoor sets, so most interior scenes were sets built outdoors with large pieces of muslin hanging overhead to diffuse sunlight.

The Wizard of Oz (1939 film) features a sequence with a tornado constructed out of muslin, measuring 35-foot-high.

=== Medicine ===
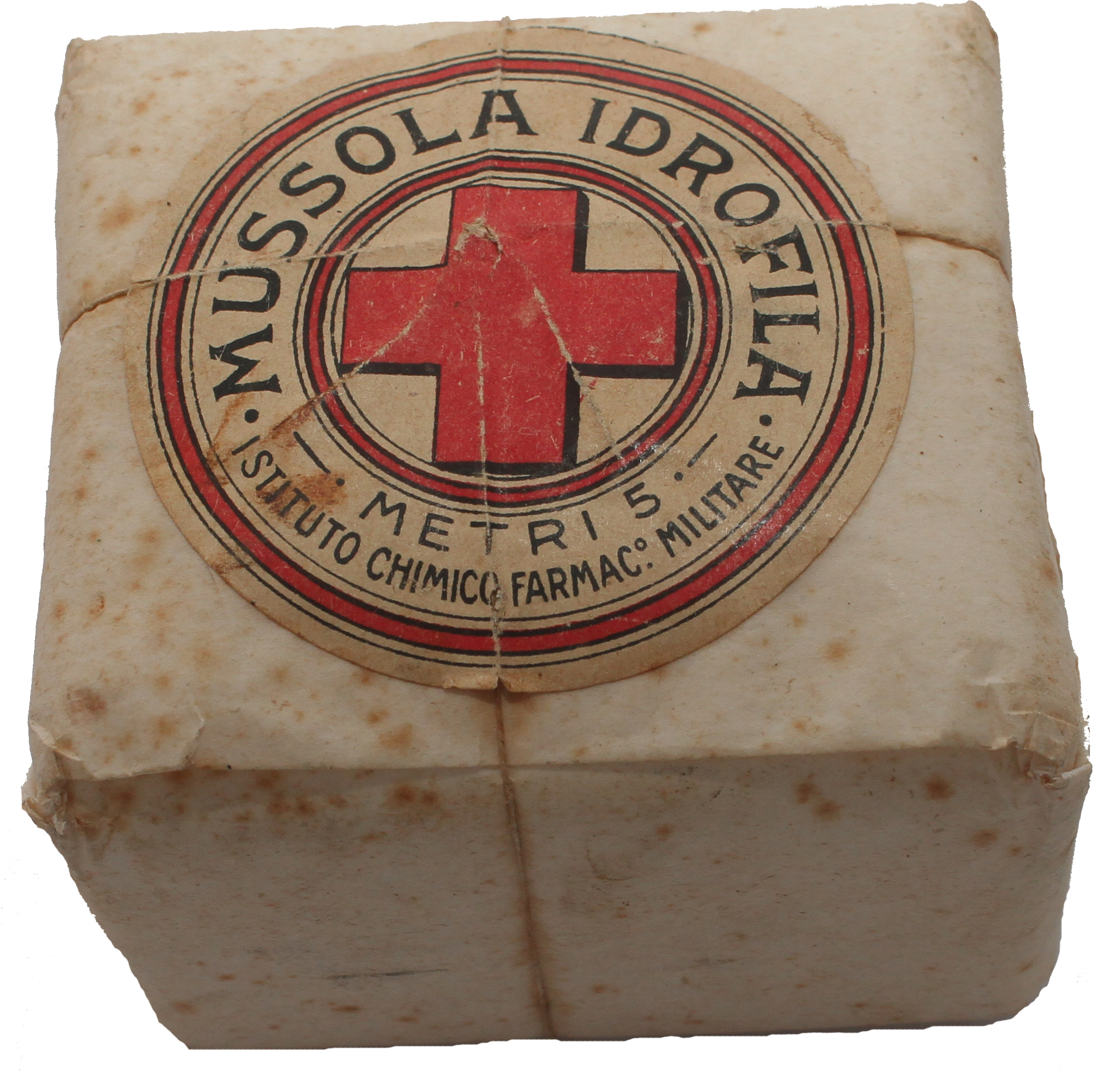
A first-aid packet of 5m of "hydrophilic muslin", given to Italian soldiers in World War I

Surgeons use muslin gauze in cerebrovascular neurosurgery to wrap around aneurysms or intracranial vessels at risk for bleeding. The thought is that the gauze reinforces the artery and helps prevent rupture. It is often used for aneurysms that, due to their size or shape, cannot be microsurgically clipped or coiled.

== Recognition ==
Many travelers and merchants of the 13th and 14th centuries praised Bengal muslin, and claimed it as the best muslin. From the Mughal rulers to the European colonial rulers, Bengal's muslins were recognized for their superiority, with the muslins produced at Sonargaon being the best.

In 2013, the traditional art of Jamdani weaving in Bangladesh was included in the list of Masterpieces of the Oral and Intangible Heritage of Humanity by UNESCO. In 2020, Dhakai Muslin was given a geographical indication status as a product of Bangladesh. In 2024, Banglar Muslin (or Bengal Muslin) was granted geographical indication status as a product of West Bengal, India.

== See also ==
- Delaine (cloth) – Kind of mixed cloth
- Muslin trade in Bengal – Textile trade in Eastern India
- Tanzeb – Type of Muslin
- Toile – Type of fabric
