= Tanzeb =

Type of Muslin

Tanzeb was another variety of muslin with a reasonably fine weave structure commonly used for chikan embroidery. The cloth was purposely woven in specified lengths, for instance, 19-20 yards for the convenience of embroidery work and subsequent usages like Dupattas and pieces for garments such as Angarkhas.

== Meaning ==
Tanzeb means what adorns the body. It is a combination word where Tan means body, and Zeb refers to an ornament. Hence the cloth was known for decorating the body.

== Origin ==
Tanzeb was originated in the second half of the eighteenth century during the reign of Āsaf al-daulah.

== Production ==
Raebareli district and the town of Jais were reputably manufacturing Tanzeb.

== Use ==
Tanzeb used for various headdresses and garments such as caps, turbans, angrakhas, and handkerchieves. Tanzeb was among the various cotton qualities exported to England.
