= Nainsook =

Soft, lightweight, plain-woven cotton fabric

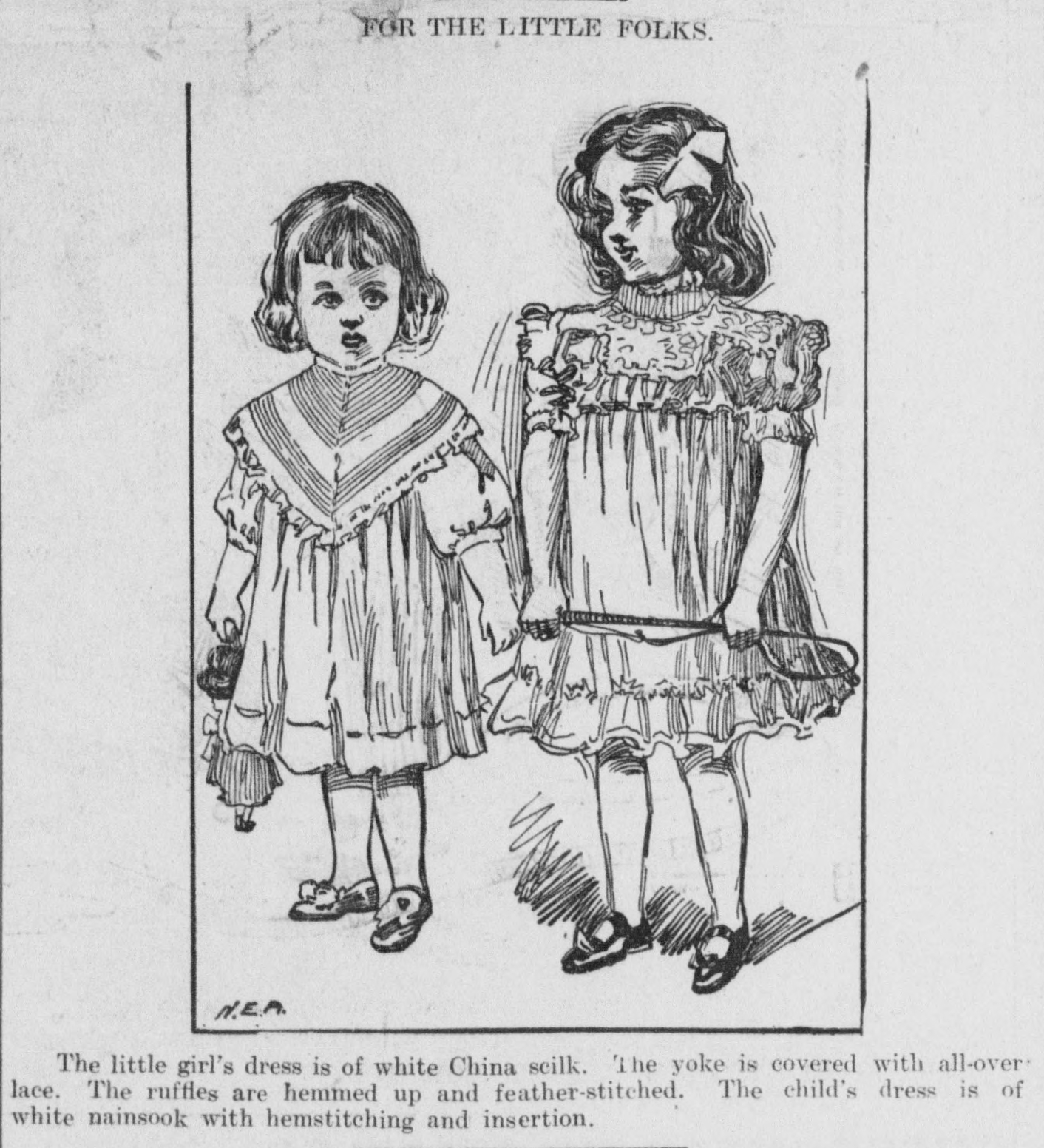
"The little girl's dress is of white China scilk (sic). The yoke is covered with all-over-lace. The ruffles are hemmed up and feather-stitched. The child's dress is of white nainsook with hemstitching and insertion."

Nainsook is a soft, fine, lightweight form of muslin. Muslin encompasses a broad range of fabrics of varying weight and fineness, but is always a plain weave, cotton fabric. The English word 'nainsook', documented from 1790 onwards, derives from the Hindi word nainsukh, which literally means "eye's delight".

Nainsook was often used to make babies' clothing or lingerie at least until the 1920s. Nainsook cotton was also often used to make bias tape in the 1950s and 1960s.

== See also ==
- Lawn cloth
