= Mulboos khas =

Kind of mulmul cloth used for royal clothing in the Mughal Empire

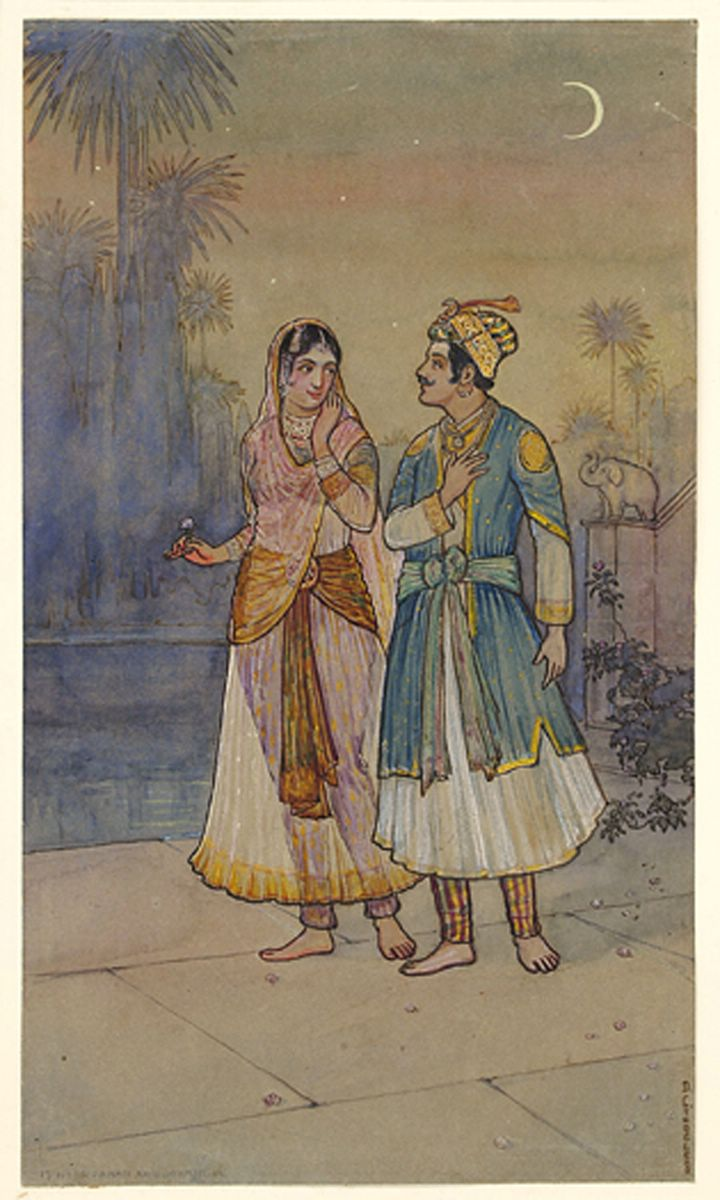
Nur Jahan and Jahangir

Mulboos khas was a special kind of mulmul cloth made for the King and used for Royal clothing in the Mughal Empire. The Mulboos khas was a kind of first-grade muslin exclusively manufactured in Royal Karkhanas (''Mulboos khas kootees'') notedly in places like Dacca, Sonargaon, Jangalbaree. Nur Jahan, the empress, was a great admirer of Dacca muslins. Mulboos khas was the finest and most expensive type of muslin, and it was used exclusively in Imperial use.

== History ==
Mulboos Khas was an item of gift exchanged between the emperors and nobles. Murshid Quli Khan who was the first Nawab of Bengal was used to send Mulboos khas to Aurangzeb.

It was also sent to Delhi for the Royal use.

The contemporary quality was "Sarkar-i-Ali," which was used for lower hierarchy.

== Characteristics ==
Mulboos khas was a piece material with 10 yards X 1-yard dimensions when produced of half-length. It was having 1800-1900 threads in warp. "Malmal khas" was the successor of Mulbool khas.

== See also ==
- Abrawan
- Muslin
- Bafta cloth
- Khasa (cloth)
