= Sindhi clothing =

Clothing style of Sindh

Sindhi clothing refers to the traditional and contemporary dress associated Sindhi culture. Common garments include the Shalwar Qameez, Kurta with Pyjama, Sari and ghagra, alongside distinctive regional forms of embroidery, headwear and shawls.

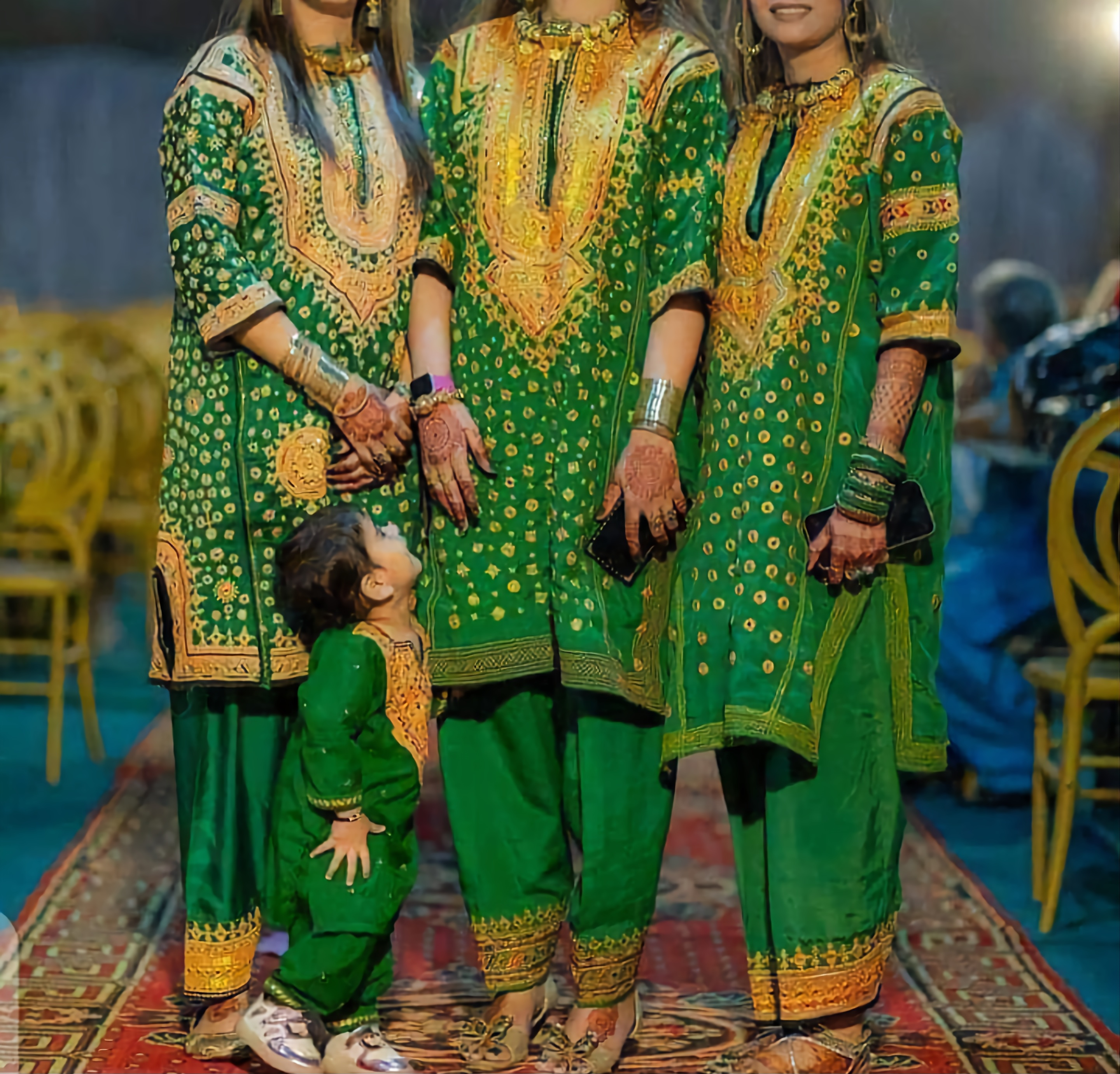
The group of Sindhi girls in traditional Sindhi clothes from central Sindh.

== History ==
Traditional Sindhi clothing reflects some elements of the dress worn by the people of the Indus Valley Civilization. During the medieval period some clothing worn in Sindh showed influences from Iraq and the neighboring regions. Short tunics, long robes and pantaloons of Iraqi style were recorded particularly around Mansura, rather than throughout Sindh. Historical accounts record the use of shalwar and suthan by Sindhi men during the 19th century, with their use later becoming more widespread, including among women.

Historically, Sindhi women wore the cholo (tunic) and paro or chhit (skirt), often over a suthan and with a long veil. By the 1930s, skirts declined in use and a suthan with cholo became more common. Sindhi men historically wore the godd or tehband among Muslims and the dhoti or treto among Hindus, paired with either a long or short angrakho or Jamo, and a sash known as a sandro was worn around the waist. Over time, the angrakho was largely replaced by the Sindhi kurta, known as the Pehrān or Pehriyān while the dhoti and godd were increasingly replaced by forms of Sindhi salwar, suthan and kancha.

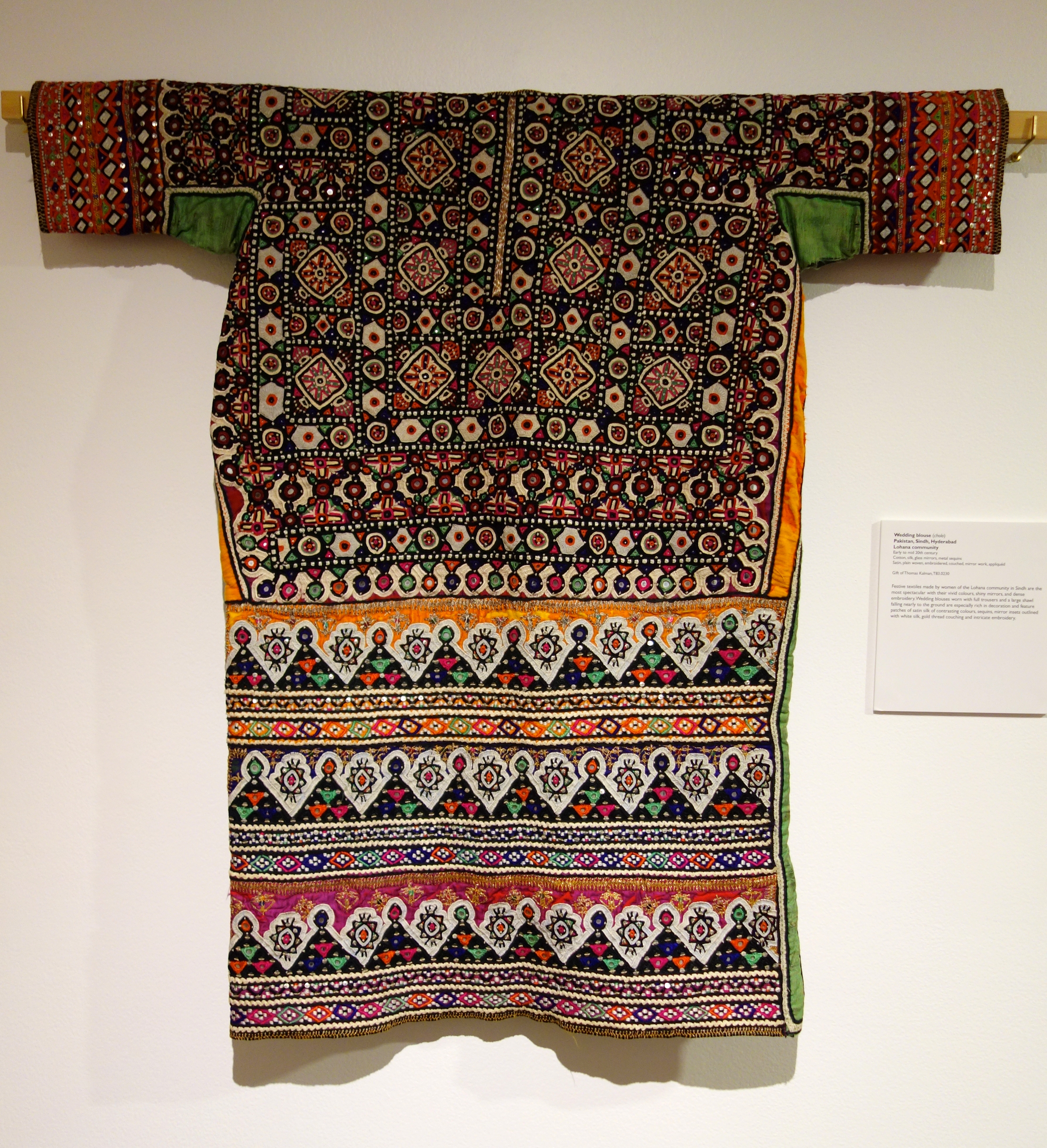
Sindhi wedding cholo from Hyderabad.

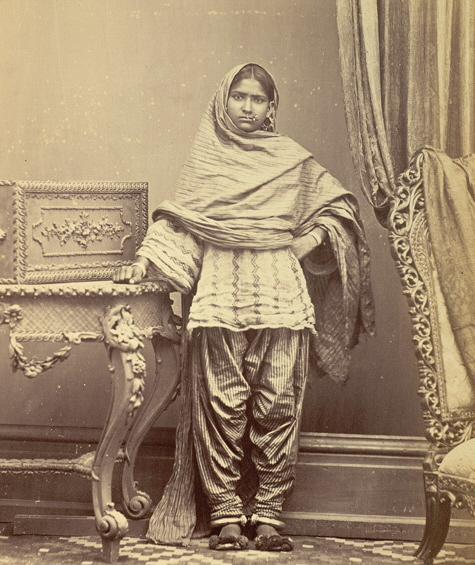
Portrait of a Hindu girl from Karachi, Sind, in narrow Sindhi sossi suthan, veil, cholo and Tauranwari jutti (traditional mules). c. 1870.

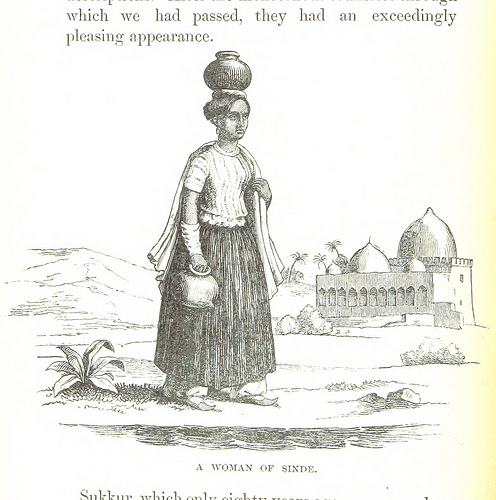

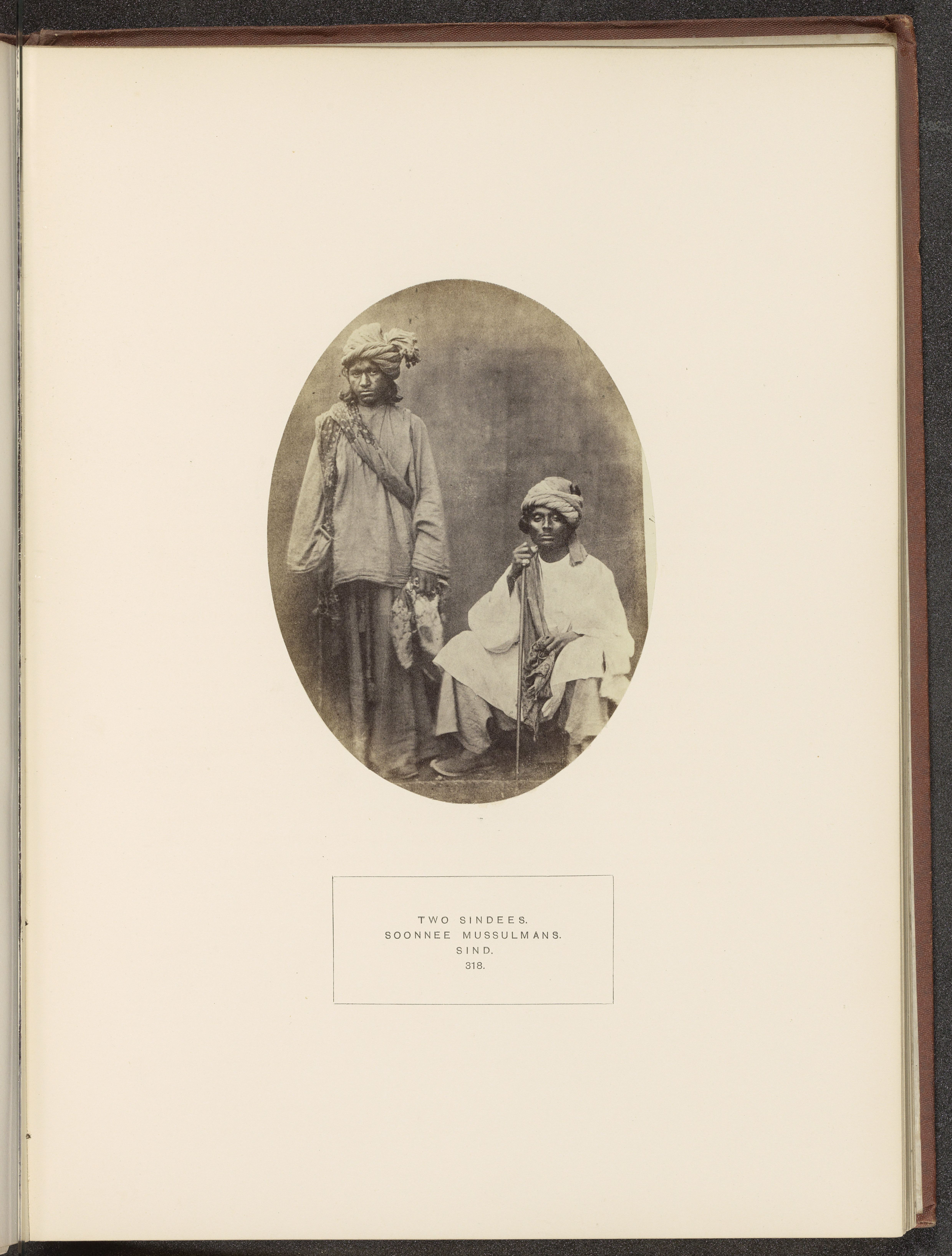
Two Sindhi men in Sindhi kancha, patko and ajrak.

== Traditional clothing ==
The traditional Sindhi clothes are very diverse and various, which differs from region to region, tribe to tribe even sometimes within tribe it differs a bit, as much as that clothes become a mark of identification of one's region and tribe.

=== Women's clothing ===
Traditional clothing worn by Sindhi women varied in style, fabric and embroidery as well as according to age, marital status, and social and economic circumstances. Wealthier women traditionally wore garments made from brocades, gold and silver-threaded fabrics, fine velvet, painted silk, satin, and other expensive textiles. Married and unmarried women commonly wore brightly coloured clothing, including red, pink, maroon, purple, blue, orange, green. Older women and widows traditionally wore white, neutral, or pastel-colored clothing.

Traditional ensembles included the cholo or choli worn with suthan or pajamo, together with skirts made of bandhani, sussi, garbi, printed fabrics or satin, and a long veil known as rao, gandhi, or poti. The traditional cholo generally extends to the knees, while some women wear longer, looser style that extends to the ankles, and traditional suthan is loose-fitting, with embroidery around the ankle cuffs. Sindhi women's clothing is characterized by vibrant colors, embroideries and mirrorwork. Sindhi embroidery bhart varies among different tribes and regions of Sindh. Some Sindhi Jat and Memon women in the Lar region of Sindh wear a long, thobe-like dress known as a Jubo, fargal or pharko. Others wear a Sindhi fairaq or ghagho a frock-like garment embroidered with gaj known as āggoti.

Historically, older Sindhi women wore the paro (petticoat), poplin cholo (tunic), and chaadar (veil), sometimes with a sleeveless shirt and waist-length koti with sleeves, on top. Suthans and skirts were made from fabrics including satin, sussi, garbi or bandhani. While the younger women wore velvet or amber suthan and jablo skirts both at home and outside, and blouse and long muslin or bandhani head covering known as rawa, gandi, or pothi. Middle aged women wore sorhi suthan. Over time, salwar-cholo combinations became more common among women. Traditional footwear worn by women were sapato, jutti (tri-phundni and tauranwari jutti), khusso or mojri.

When women went outside the house, they covered the suthan under a wide paro or peshgir. A rawo or salur, a large white veil was worn over the upper body and head. Among Sayyid women, particularly in northern Sindh, the burko or chadree of Arabian and Persian styles, were also commonly worn. Hindu women generally wore the paro larger and longer than the Muslim women. They usually preferred the cholo without a gaj, and wore a white veil over the head.

=== Jewelry ===
Sindhi women traditionally wear a variety of gold and silver jewelry. There is some differences in the ornaments of Muslim and Hindu women. Among married Muslim Sindhi women, the Nath, or bullo, bulli, phuli or popa is an important jewel and is associated with marital status. In Sindh, the traditional bangles worn were large rings of ivory known as Aaj ja chura or churiyun covering the fore arms or full arms; these bangles were worn by women across different religious communities and social classes. Some women wore Banhi, silver cuff-like bracelets. In contemporary Sindh, glass bangles and gold or silver Kangar or Kara bracelets are commonly worn. Anklets and toe rings have also traditionally been worn by Sindhi women.

Sindhi enameled bracelets

=== Sindhi Julaba ===
The Julaba is very loose, ankle-length garment made from handwoven or blocked-printed fabric. It maybe hooded, embroidered and fastened with ties at a V-shaped neckline, with side slits extending towards hem.

=== Saluka ===
The Saluka is a tight fitting waistcoat which was worn by some Sindhi and the Punjabi women.

=== Gaj ===
Gaj or Gajj is a traditional embroidery on chola tunics worn by Sindhi women, it features dense embroidery combined with mirrorwork, pompoms, sequins, cowries, shells, beads and buttons, generally covering the area of the garment from neckline to the stomach. Gaj embroidery incorporates a variety of stitches and colors. Sometimes, the embroidery is worked on a separate piece of cloth, which is subsequently attached to the garment.

The embroidery patterns of Gaj are commonly arranged within a framework of two or three symmetrical geometric or floral blocks on each side of the front. These may include square, circular, heart-shaped or paisley-shaped motifs, with an arrow-like straight line extending downward to the abdomen between the blocks. Other patterns consist of a single block on each side of the yoke, accompanied by horizontal or vertical lines, or both, across the front. In simpler forms, the embroidery may consist of a straight arrow-like line running down the front of the tunic. The sleeves and borders may also be embroidered.

There are also other styles and stitches of Gaj embroidery specific to each region and tribe. The Larai jats of Lār region call it "Āggoti". A single Gaj can take up months or weeks to complete. Gaj was usually worn on special occasions, specially for bride and for the dowry of woman, while married women wore it as everyday outfit, today only worn on cultural days or events. Some women still wear minimal Gaj embroidered yokes or necklines called galo and gichi with mirrorwork, on modern style clothes.

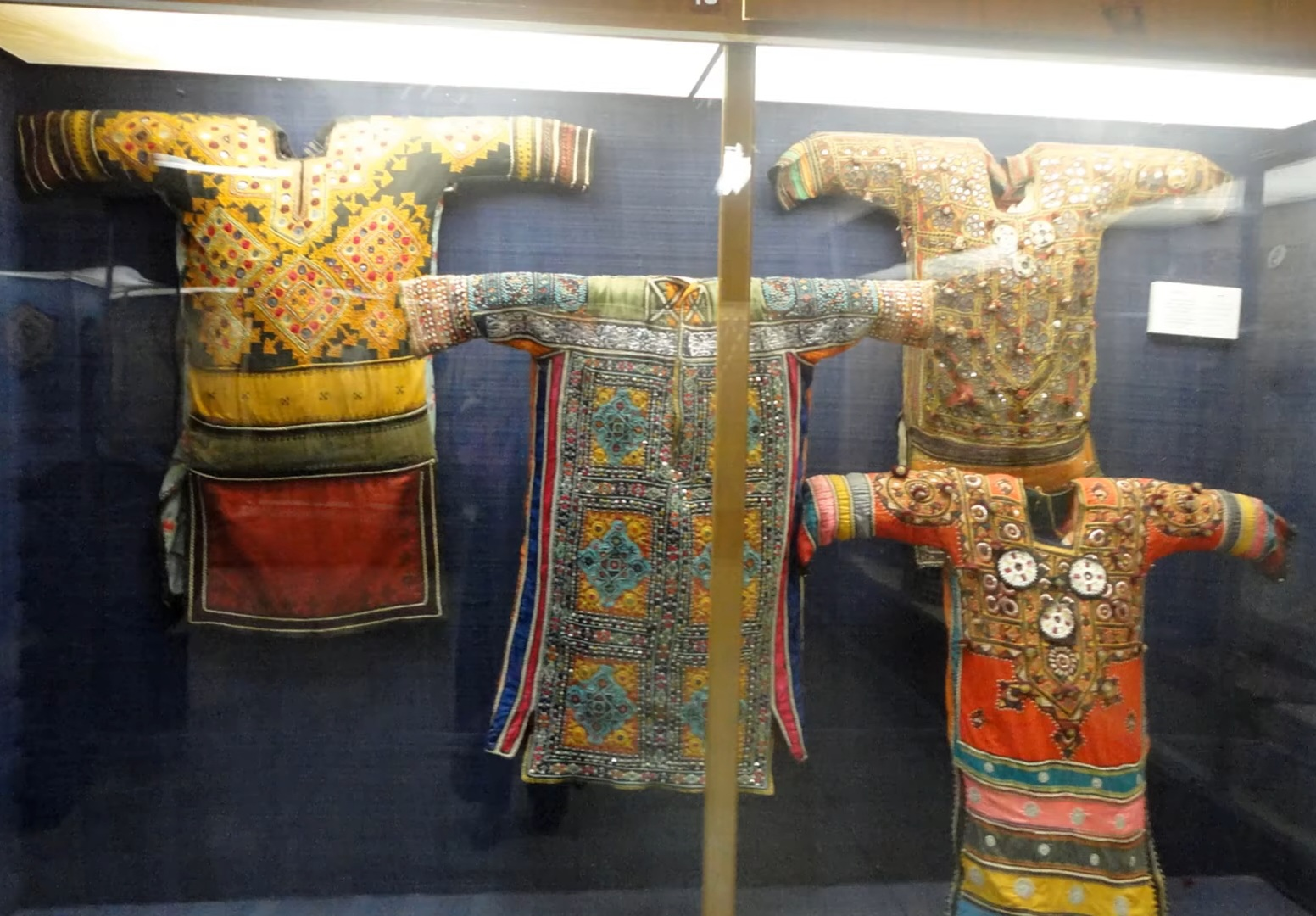
Traditional Sindhi cholo with gaj fronts worn by Sammat Muslim women in South Sindh "Lar, Kohistan, Lasbelo and Thar regions".

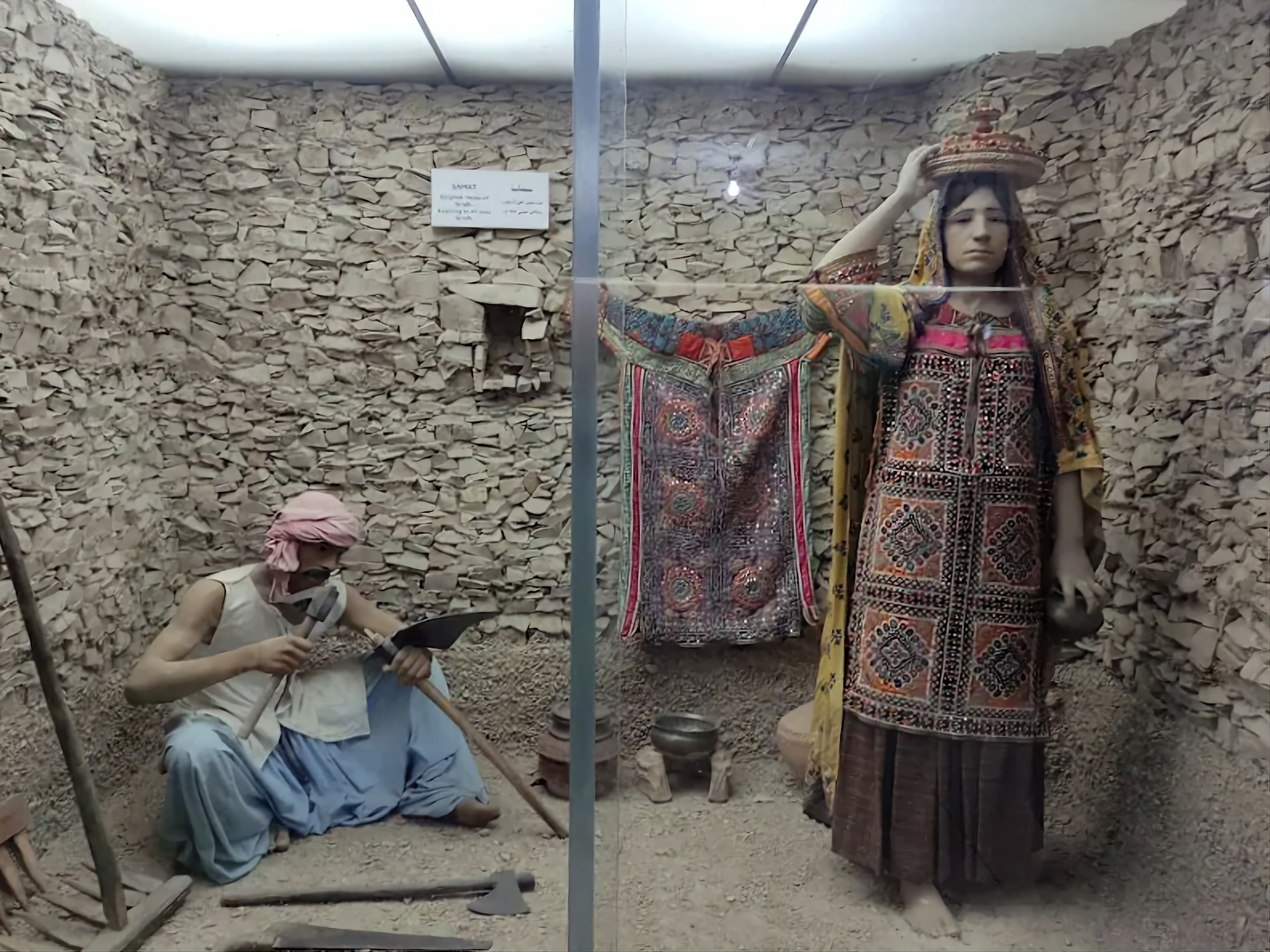
The statue of man and woman showing traditional Sindhi clothing, displayed in a museum.

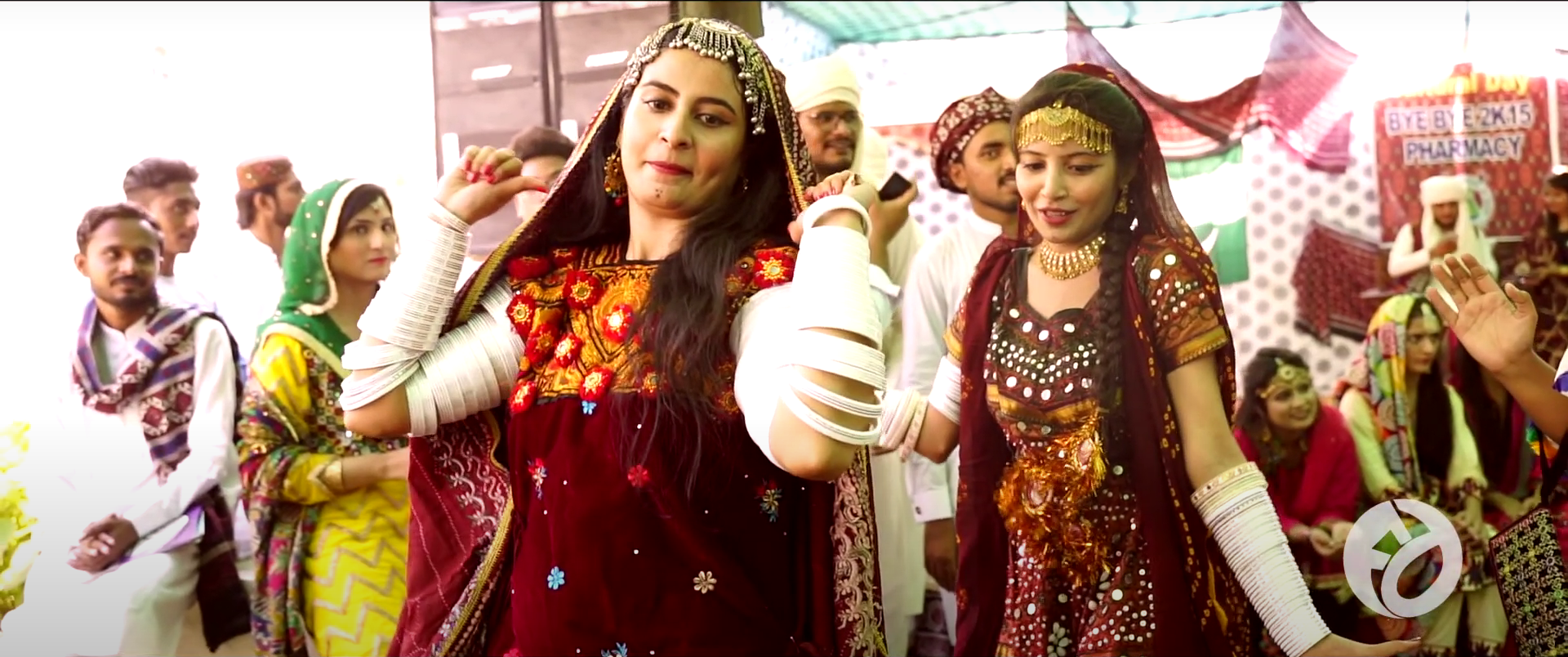
Sindhi women wearing traditional clothing on Sindhi Cultural Day in Jamshoro, Pakistan.

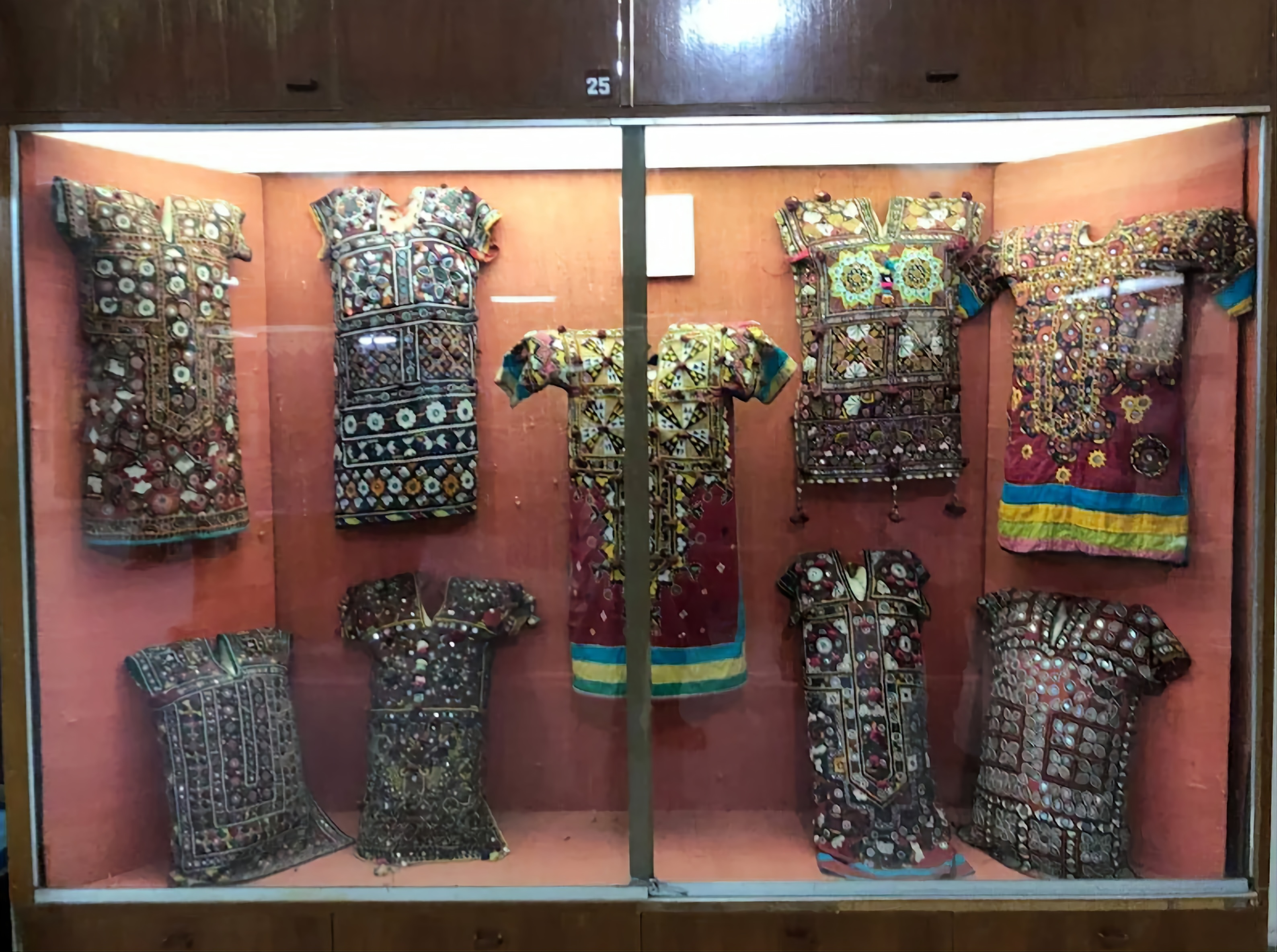
Traditional Sindhi Gaj from Thar desert of Sindh.

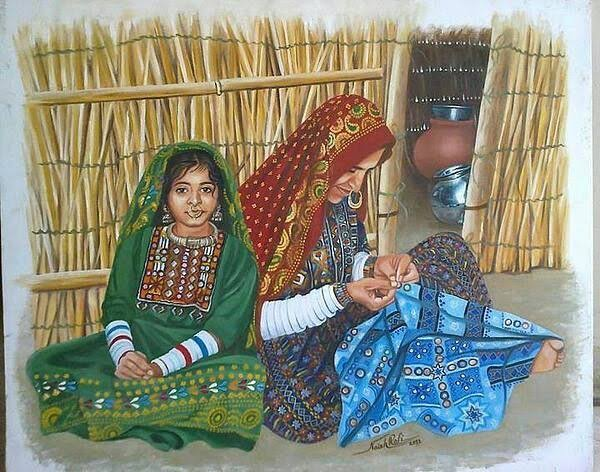
Painting of Sindhi Jat women wearing Jubo.

=== Sari ===
Saris have been worn particularly by Lohana, Waniya, Khatri and Brahmin Hindu women, Sindhi Hindu women who adopted Sarees from other regions of India. During the 20th century, Sindhi women took to wearing net and chiffon sarees embroidered with gold or silver thread, and velvet blouses. Sometimes georgette sarees were paired with crocheted blouses In Sindh sarees were draped both ways in front pallu and back pallu saree style.

Some Memon, Shaikh and Khowaja community women also wear Saris on special occasions like weddings, parties, events etc.

=== Men's clothing ===
Historically, Sindhi men's dress included jamo or angrakho (upper garment) godd, dhoti or suthan (lower garments), pagg or patko (turban), young men wore the Sindhi cap. Ajrak, lungee or other locally made shawls were carried over the shoulders. for everyday wear, floral, checkered or plain rumal, bochhan or towal are commonly carried over the shoulders, may also be embroidered. Rich men wore Sherwanis with gold buttons. Some poor men also wore a Puthiyo or Kiriyo a cotton jacket resembling the Indian Mirzai, with a sash worn around the waist. The sadri, gidi, koti or phatui, a waistcoat made of rich or brightly colored fabrics and sometimes embroidered with mirrors was also worn by some men.

During winter, men wore a long coat known as a kaba, made of white cotton and resembling a European nightshirt, which was padded with cotton, another garment a nimtano, was similar in construction but had long sleeves extending only to the elbows. Wealthier men wore fur garments, while poor wore posteen, masho, or chogho, cloaks made from felted goat and camel hair. The footwear included two main types: the jutti of different types, made of red or yellow leather, and the ghetalo, made of leather and embroidered with cloth or silk. Wealthy men travelling wore a type of leather boot known as the mozo. In hilly areas, a sole made from the leaves of a dwarf palm known as teesh was used to protect the feet.

Today, traditional Sindhi clothing includes the Sindhi-style salwar khamis, which is commonly worn as everyday dress. The traditional Sindhi khamis was usually shorter than the modern khamis. Before the adoption of the khamis, Sindhi men wore shorter form of the angrakho known as the angelo or angeli. Later, the Sindhi pehriyān or pehrān, a collarless kurta-like tunic resembling the Sindhi angelo, became common. It was tied at either side or in the center. Unlike the angelo, which is completely open at the front, the pehrān has a half-length opening at either side or in the middle, secured with two strings. Both the angelo and pehriyan were sometimes embroidered with mirrorwork. Sindhi men also wear embroidered vests known as ganji beneath the khamis.

=== Sindhi salwars ===
- Sindhi suthan: the Sindhi salwar or suthan has relatively few pleats and is narrower below the knees.
- Kancha: has wide pacha ankle cuffs and was traditionally worn by men in the past.
- Sorhi suthan: some men and women, particularly Hindus, also wore tight-fitting churidar pyjamas; women wore them underneath skirts.
- Chareno suthan: is a pair of white pants, which are voluminous on the thighs, slightly narrowed on the knees, gathered in at the instep and pleated to the ankles.

All forms of salwar are tied at the waist with an aggath (drawstring), which may be made in various bright colors and heavily ornamented with metallic threads, beads, mirrors, and other embellishments. The pleats are created by gathering the folds together on both sides.

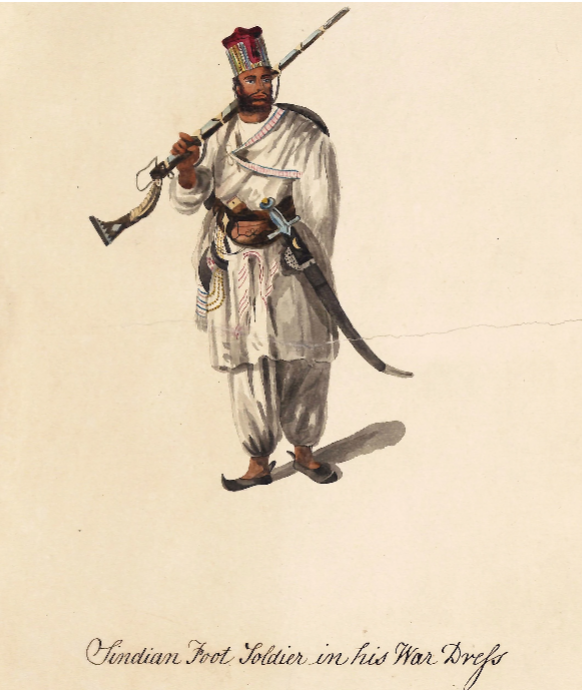
Sindhi foot soldier in his war dress

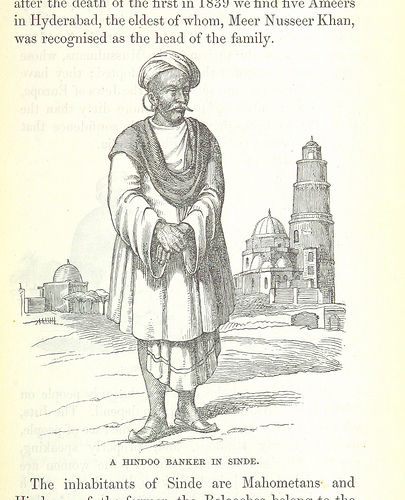
A Sindhi Hindu banker in long angerkho and dhoti, (1845)

== Sindhi headwear ==
Sindh has its own variety of hats, caps and turbans.

- Sindhi topi: is a cylindrical skullcap with an arched opening at the front. It has roots during the Kalhora dynasty. It is embroidered with geometrical designs with small pieces of mirrors or gemstones sewed into it.
- Serai hat: were usually made in brightly coloured velvets or flamboyant brocades, always with the contrasting panels at centre back and front of the drum. They were worn throughout the 18th and 19th century by Muslims in Sindh. Originally monopolised by government officials and lawyers.
- Mogho topu: The square hat, made of black cloth or kincob (cloth of gold), called "mogho topu", belonged to higher and wealthier classes. It is not worn anymore.

There are three different kinds of turbans:

1. The Paga: A long cotton cloth, generally white, sometimes dyed.
2. The Patako, Pothio: Resembling the former, but smaller and sometimes used ajrak or lungi cloth.
3. The Phentiyo: A fold of cotton stuff, loosely twisted round the head. Bright in colors, usually of bandhani fabric.

White and Indigo-dyed turbans were generally preferred, some people particularly fakirs, dervishs and malangs wear turbans made of green, black, red or orange color. These colours are traditionally associated with Sufi saints of Sindh: black with Shah Abdul Latif Bhittai, red with Lal Shahbaz Qalandar, orange with Sachal Sarmast, and green with Shah Noorani.

- Top: also called toplo or kantop are traditional handmade winter hoods worn by children. It is made in various styles, including a round, circular style with a jhalar (decorative fringe), and a cone-shaped style. some are embroidered and embellished with mirrorwork, pompoms, beads, shells, cowries, and buttons sewn onto the hood.
- Sindhi faqeeri topi: a circular skullcap made of patchwork, worn by sufi devotees and fakirs.
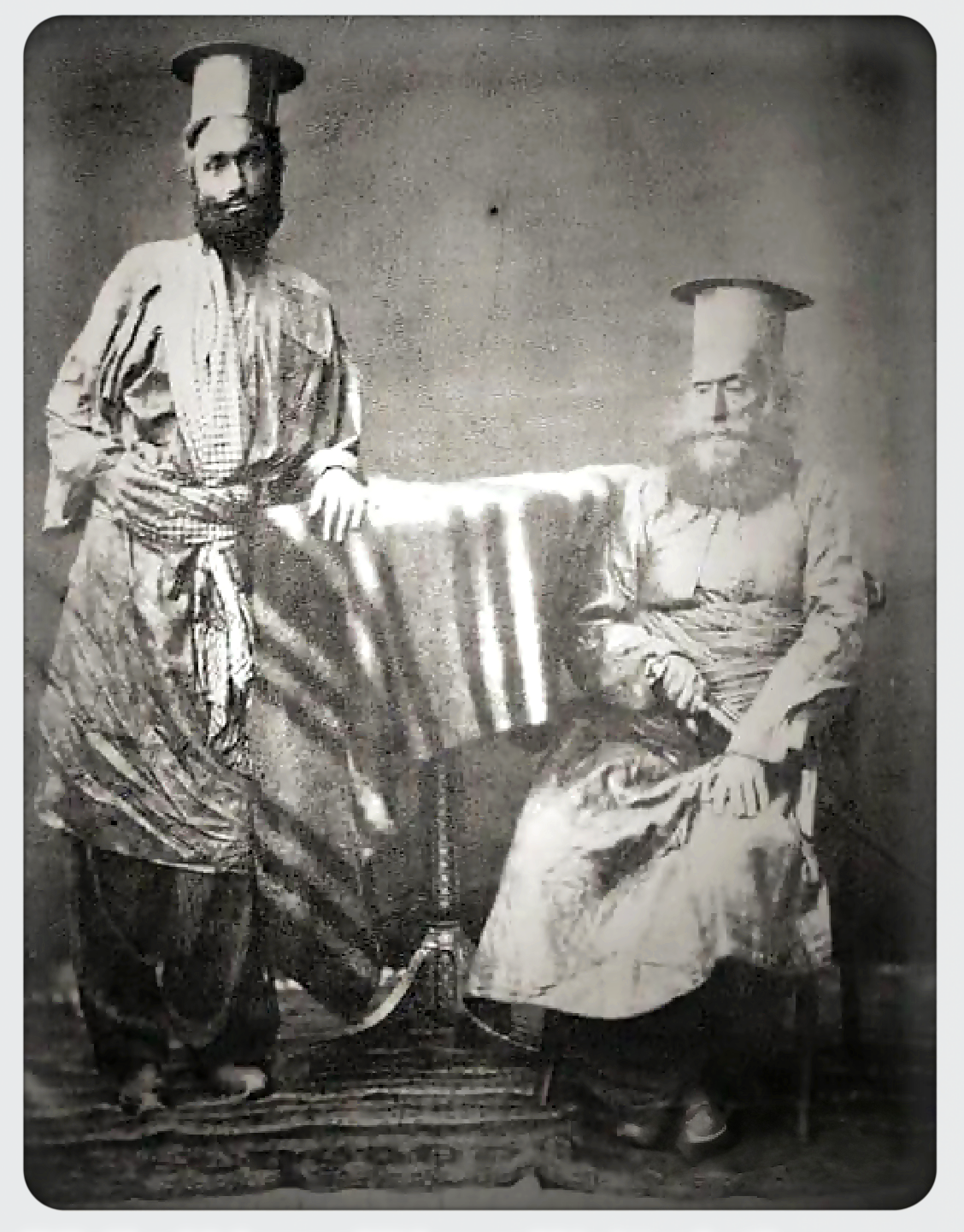
Mir Sher Muhammad and his attendant wearing the Serai hat.

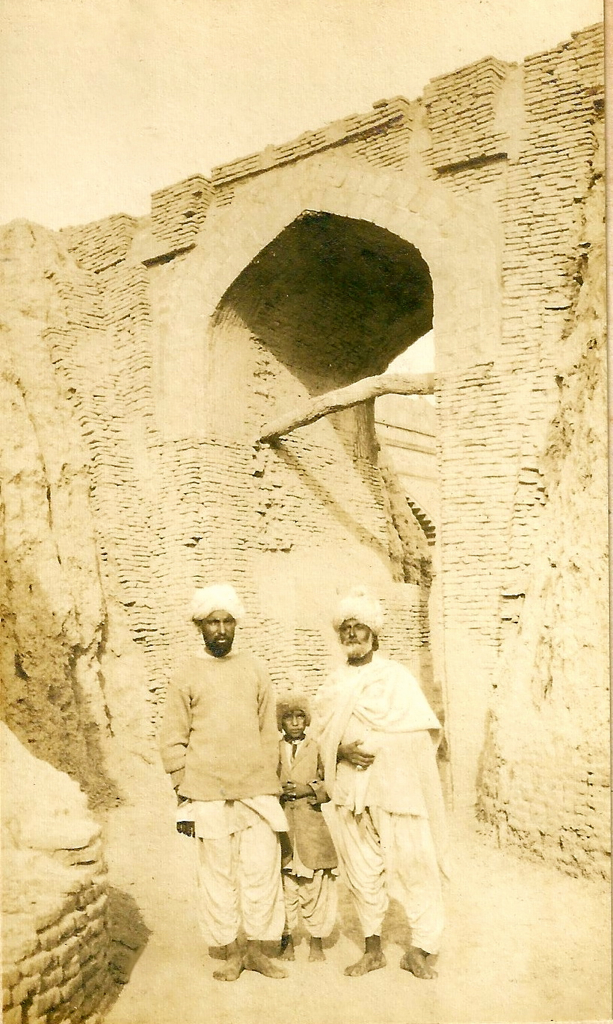
Two Muslim Sindhi men in Sindhi suthan and pehran with patko (turbans) and Loi (shawl), Hyderabad, Sindh.

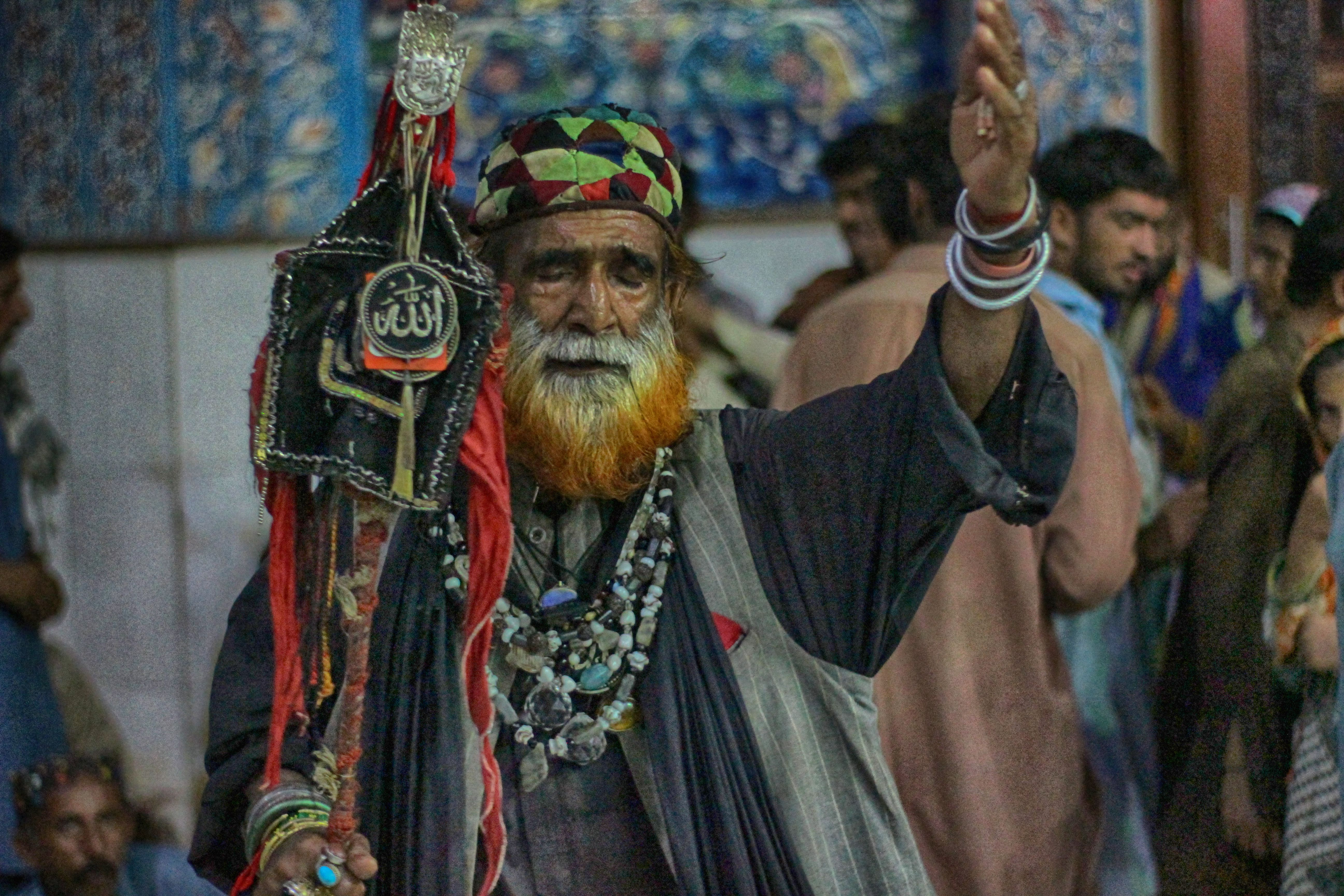
A malang wearing Faqeeri topi at the shrine of Hazrat Lal Shahbaz Qalandar.

== Sindhi Shawls ==
Ajrak: the block-printed shawls used by men, the traditional ajrak has various designs of maroon or crimson, white and black color.

Maleer: a block-printed shawl for women and bridegrooms (doshalo), often embroidered with mirrorwork.

Lungee: made of silk, cotton and wool, in bright and soft colours with woven broad borders of silver and gold thread. These are worn as shawl and as turbans on ceremonious occasions.

Sindhi khatha: commonly known as thari shawls, these are handwoven winter textiles, commonly produced in black, white and multicolored striped designs.

Abochhini: also spelled abochani or bochini are embroidered shawls traditionally worn by brides; related shawls known as Bochhan were worn by bridegrooms. from early to mid 19th and 20th century. The large, wide embroidered shawls with silk threads, mirrors, beads sometimes cardamom and cloves are also stitched on it. Many Sindhi tribes like Khaskheli, Memons and Lohanas make Butti flower motifs on Abochhinis. The Soomra tribe have scattered buds of Akk plant (Calotropis procera) embroidered in typical Phulri (Herringbone) stitch, various other motifs like Bayri (Ziziphus jujuba), Kanwal (Lotus), stitches and colors are used on it.

Loi/Loee: these are handwoven lightweight winter shawls, commonly produced in cream colors.

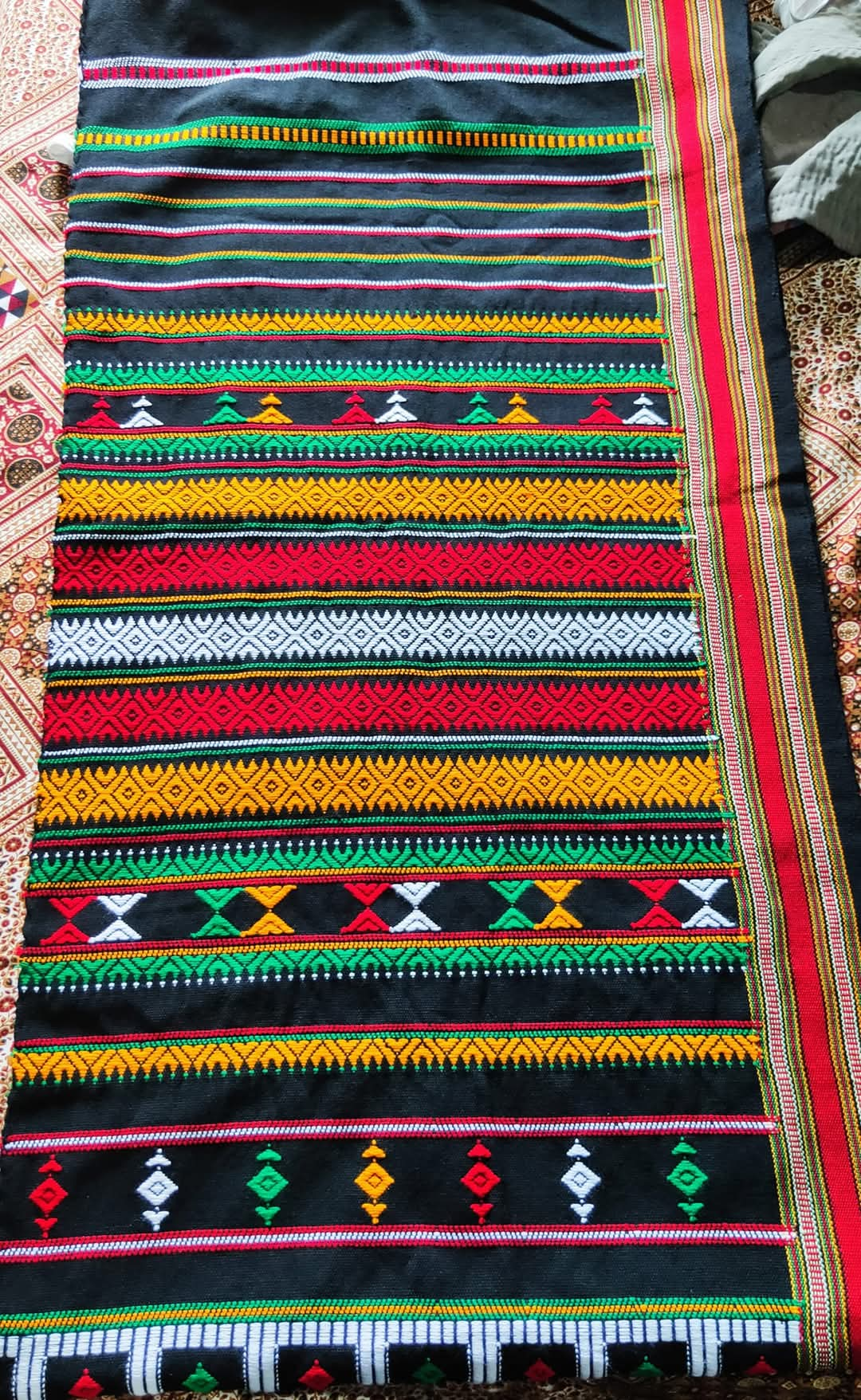
Traditional Sindhi khatha handwoven winter shawl.

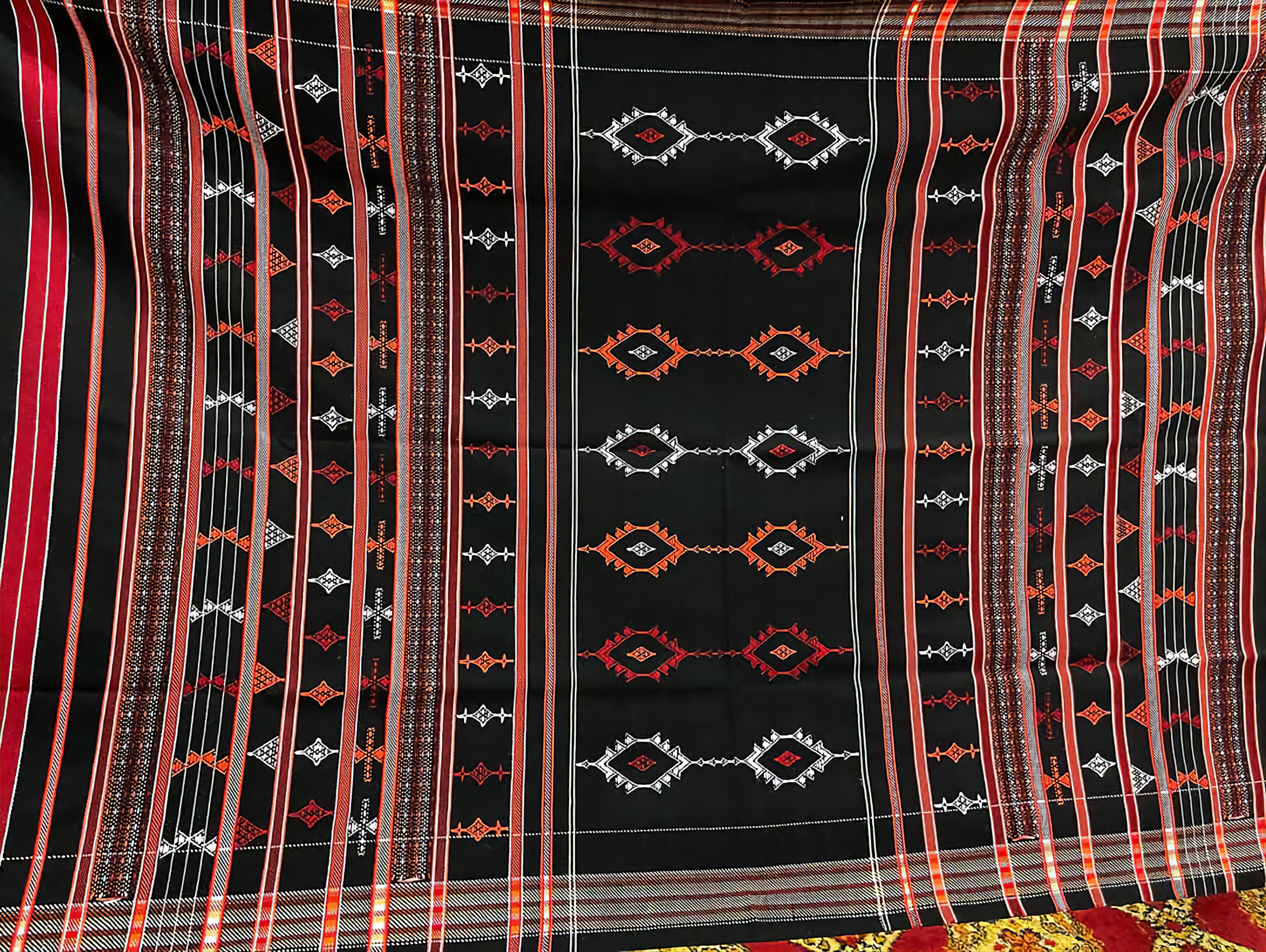
Traditional Sindhi khatha shawls.

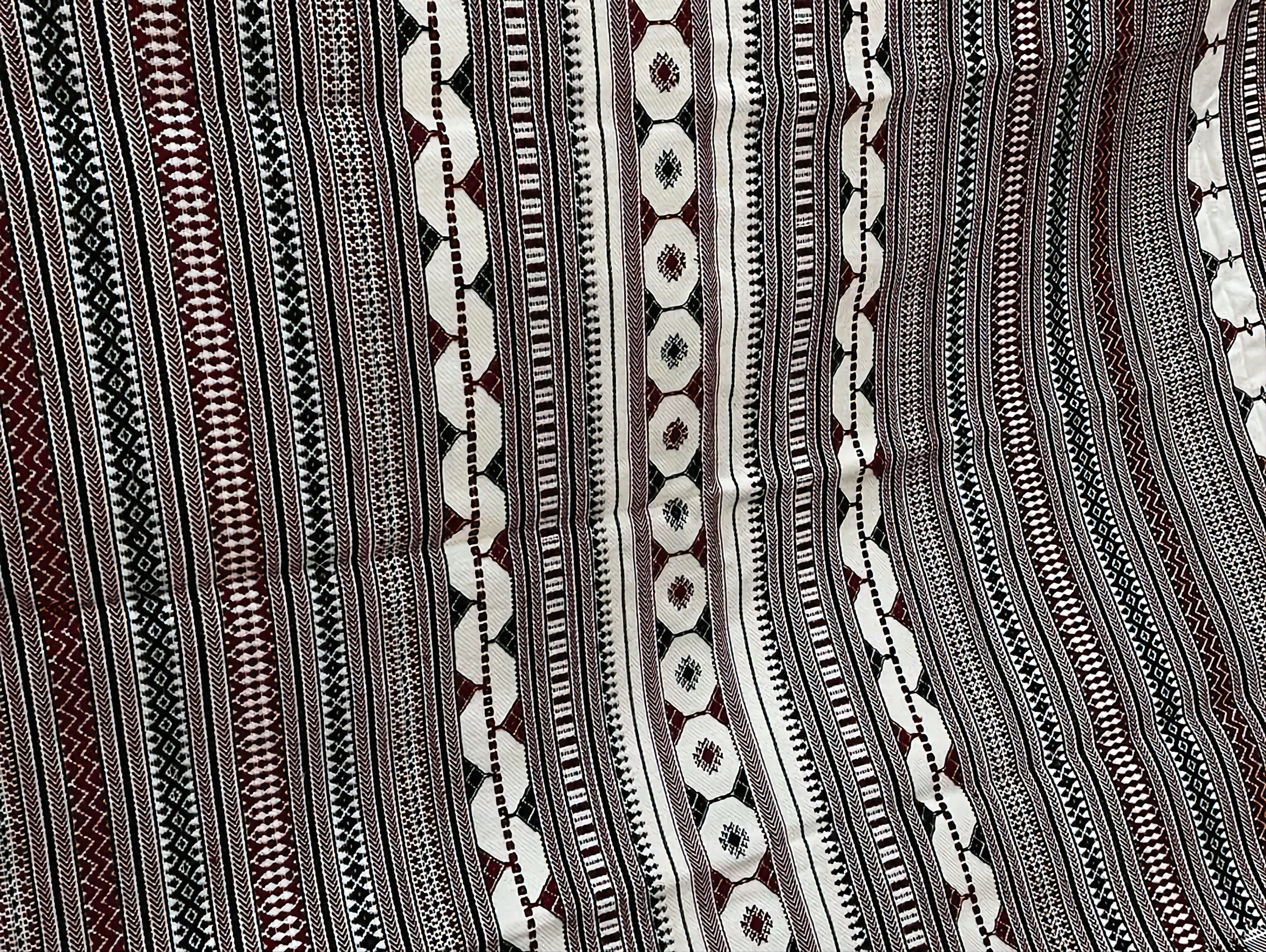

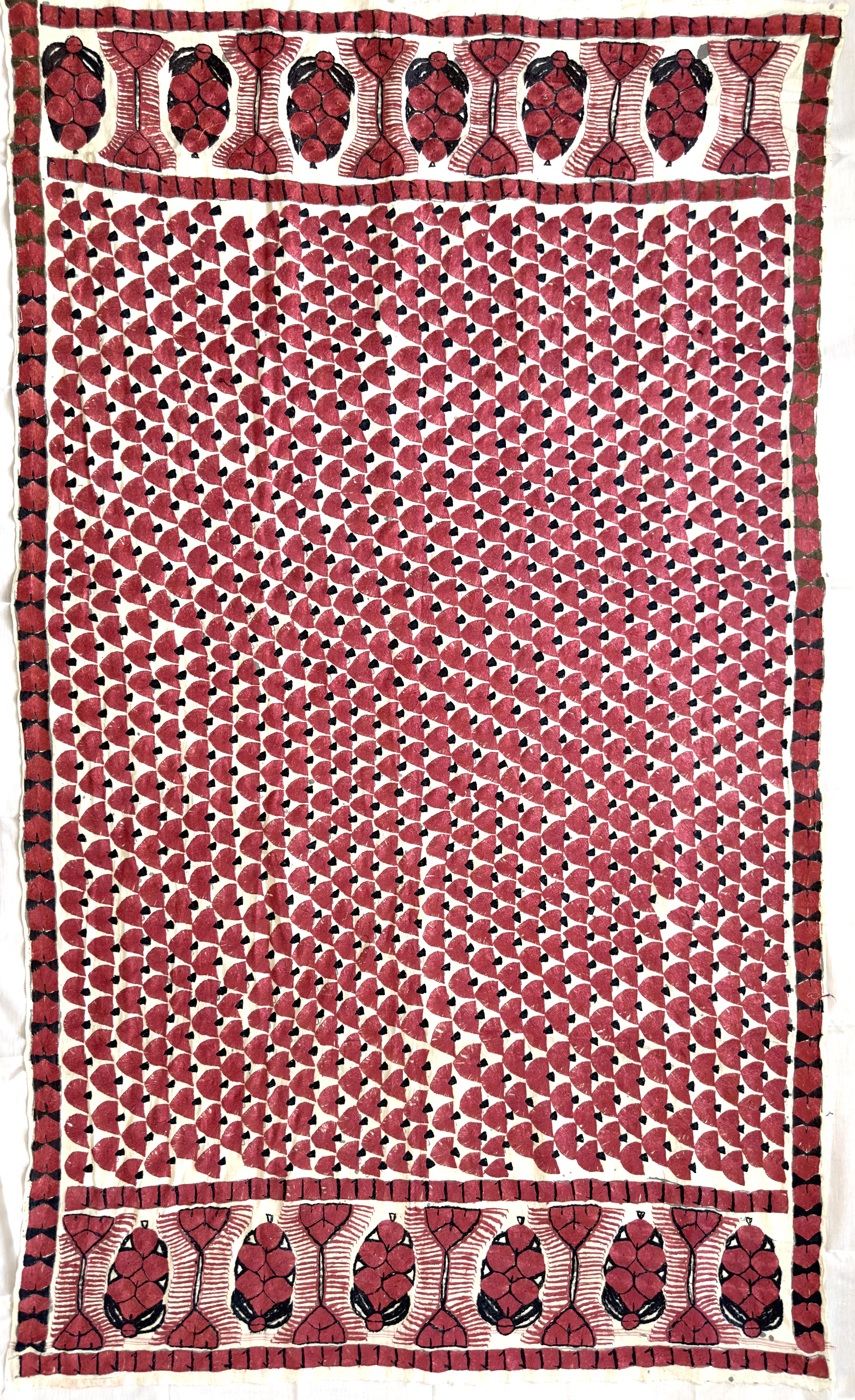
Traditional Abochhini shawl

== Modern clothing ==
Sindhi style shalwar kameez and kurta are widely worn in Sindh, often incorporating local prints, embroidery, mirrorwork, and ajark-inspired designs. Sindhi modern clothing may also feature bandhani or tuk appliqué decoration. Western-style clothing is also worn, particularly by younger people.

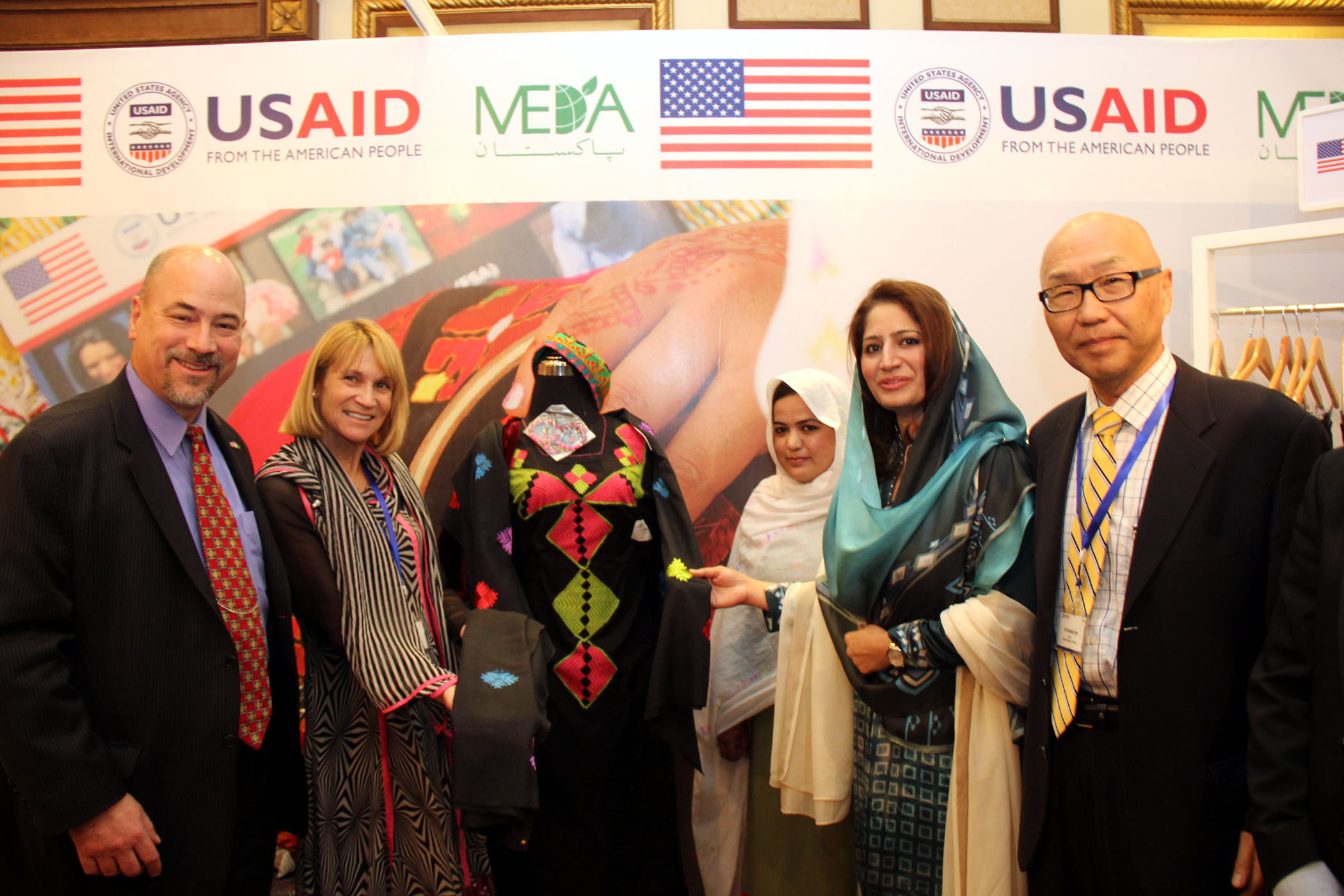
Sindhi Gulkari (Phulkari) embroidered modern style chola.

== Gallery ==
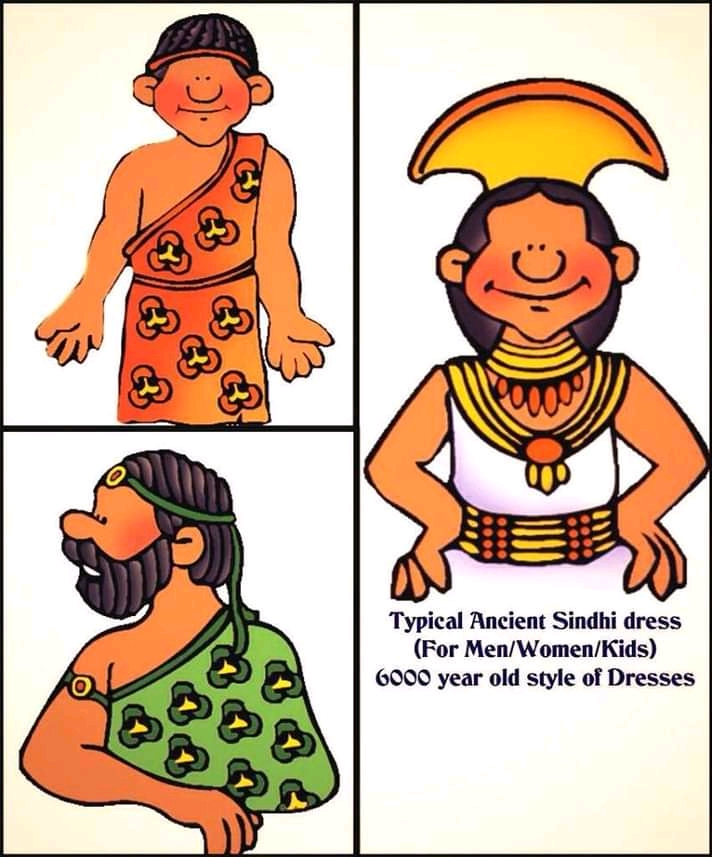
Image showing clothing in Indus valley civilization

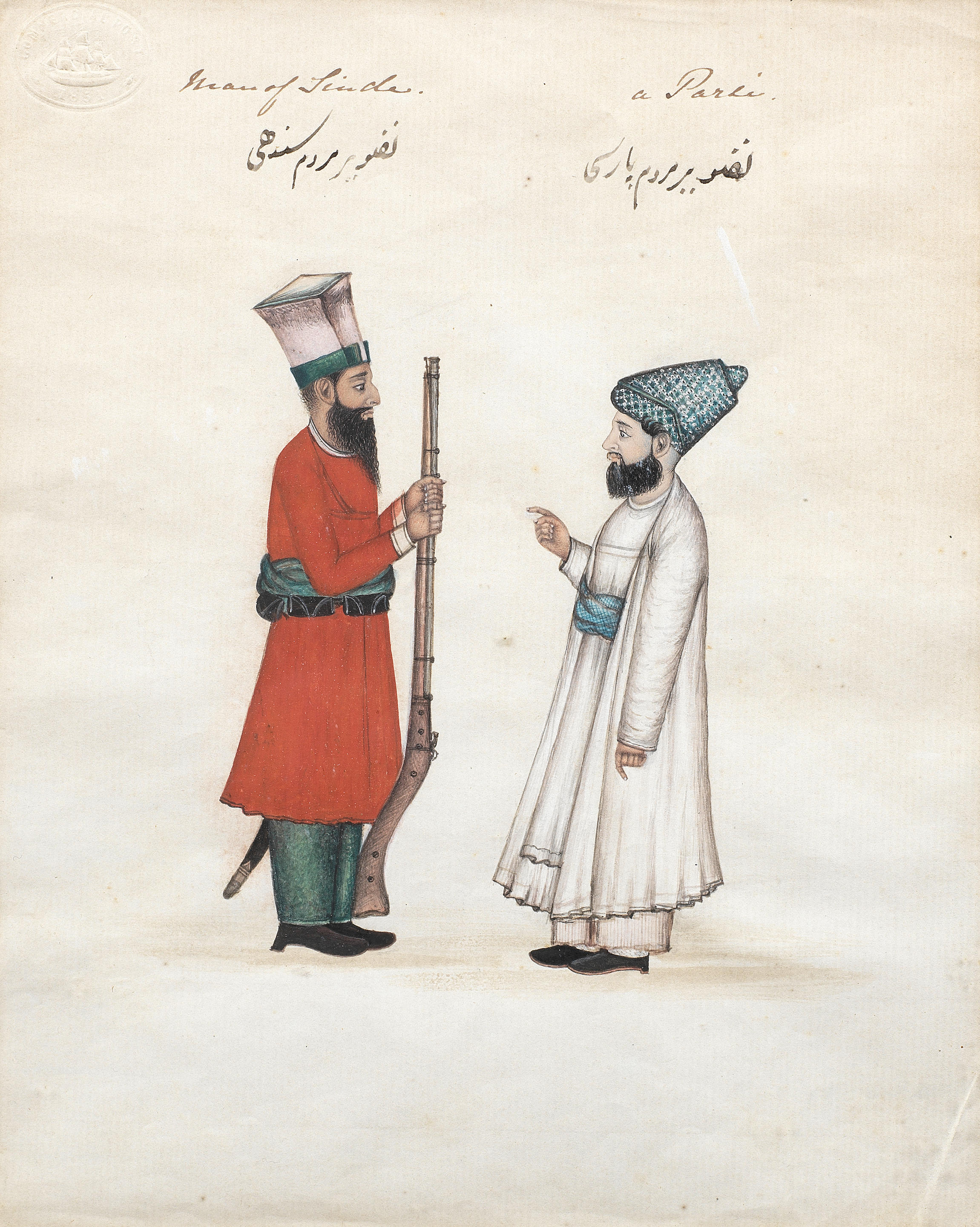
Painting of a Sindhi and a Parsi from a series of twelve paintings, c.1850

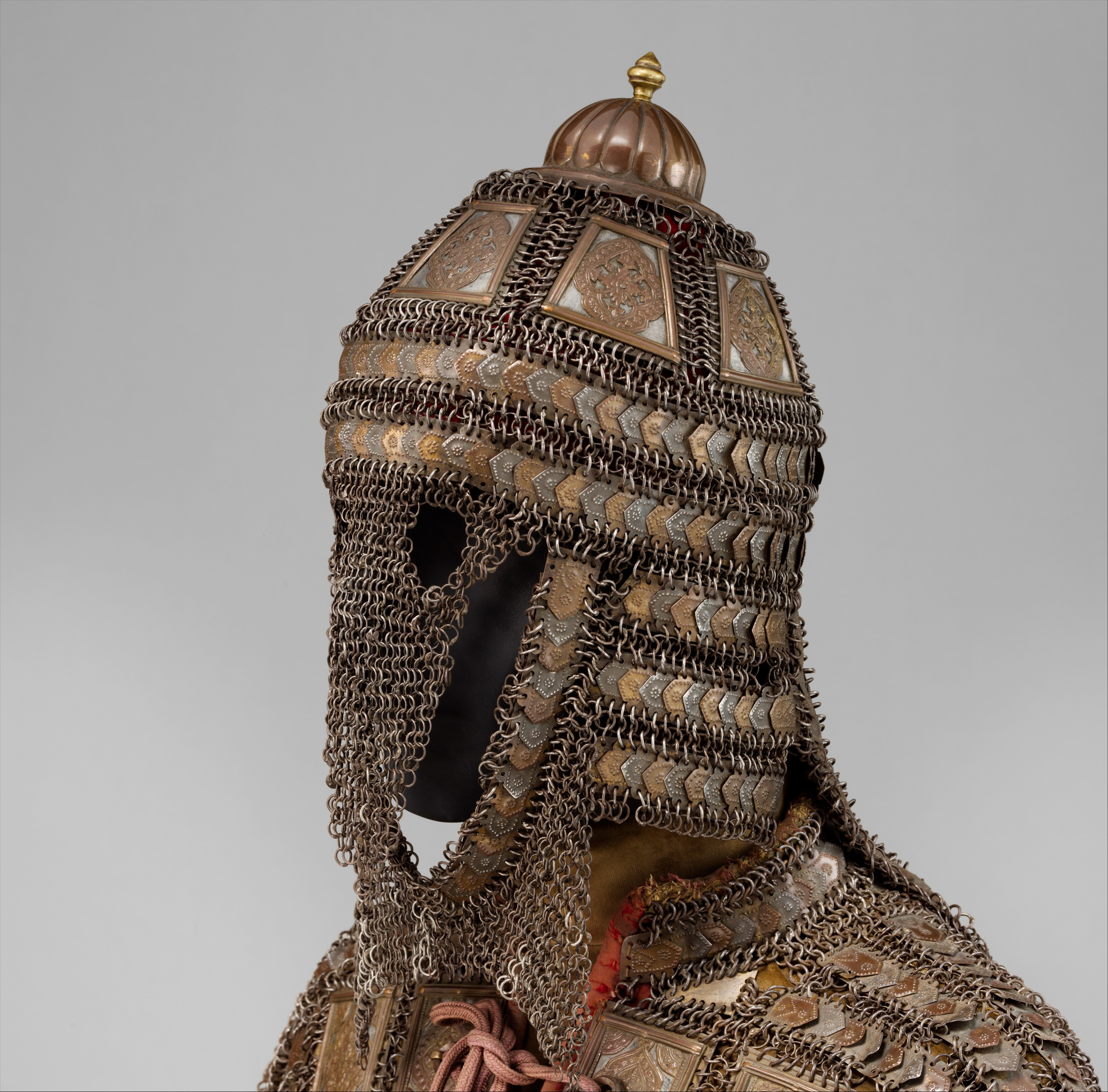
Sindhi Armor

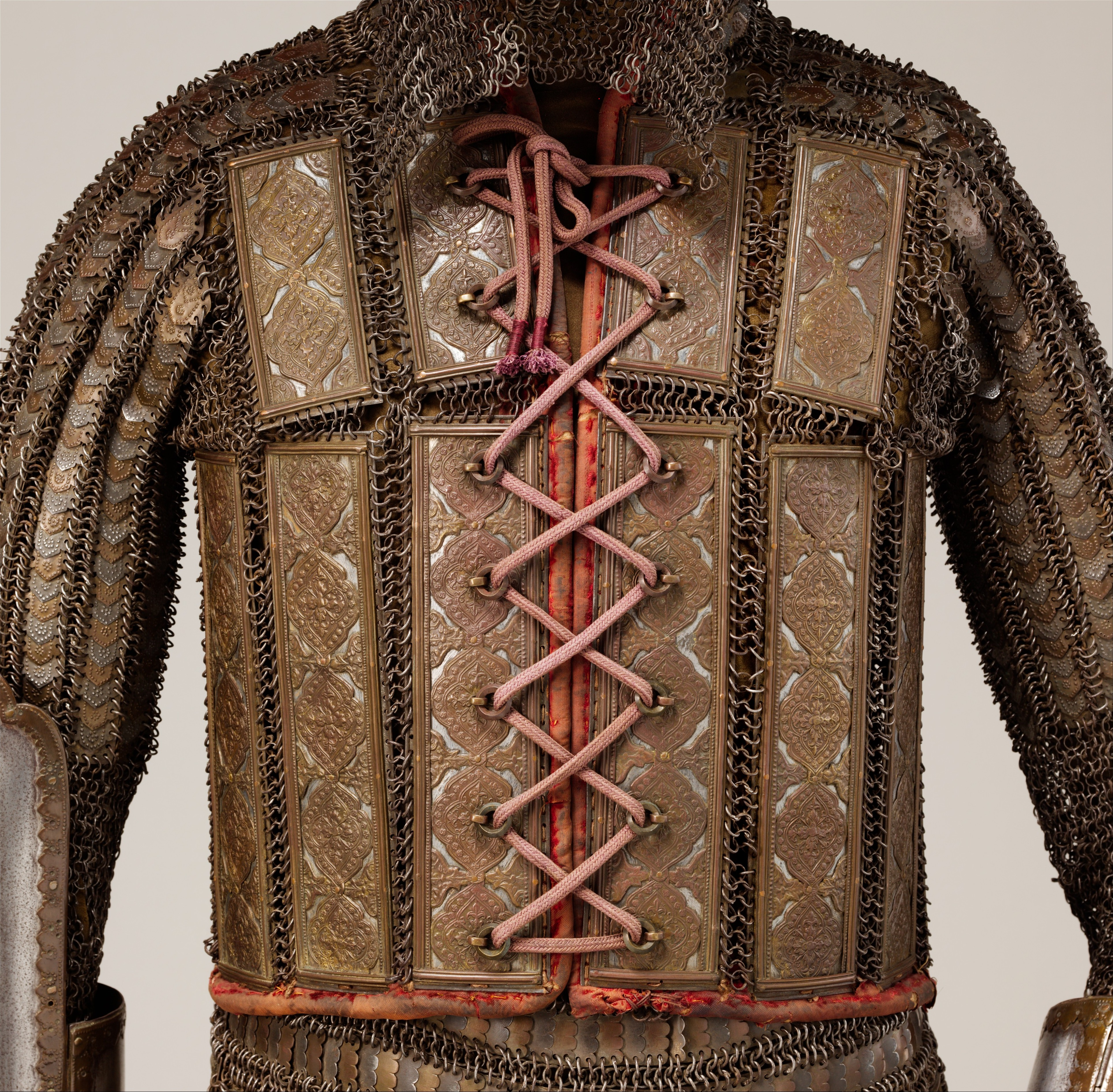
Sindhi Armor

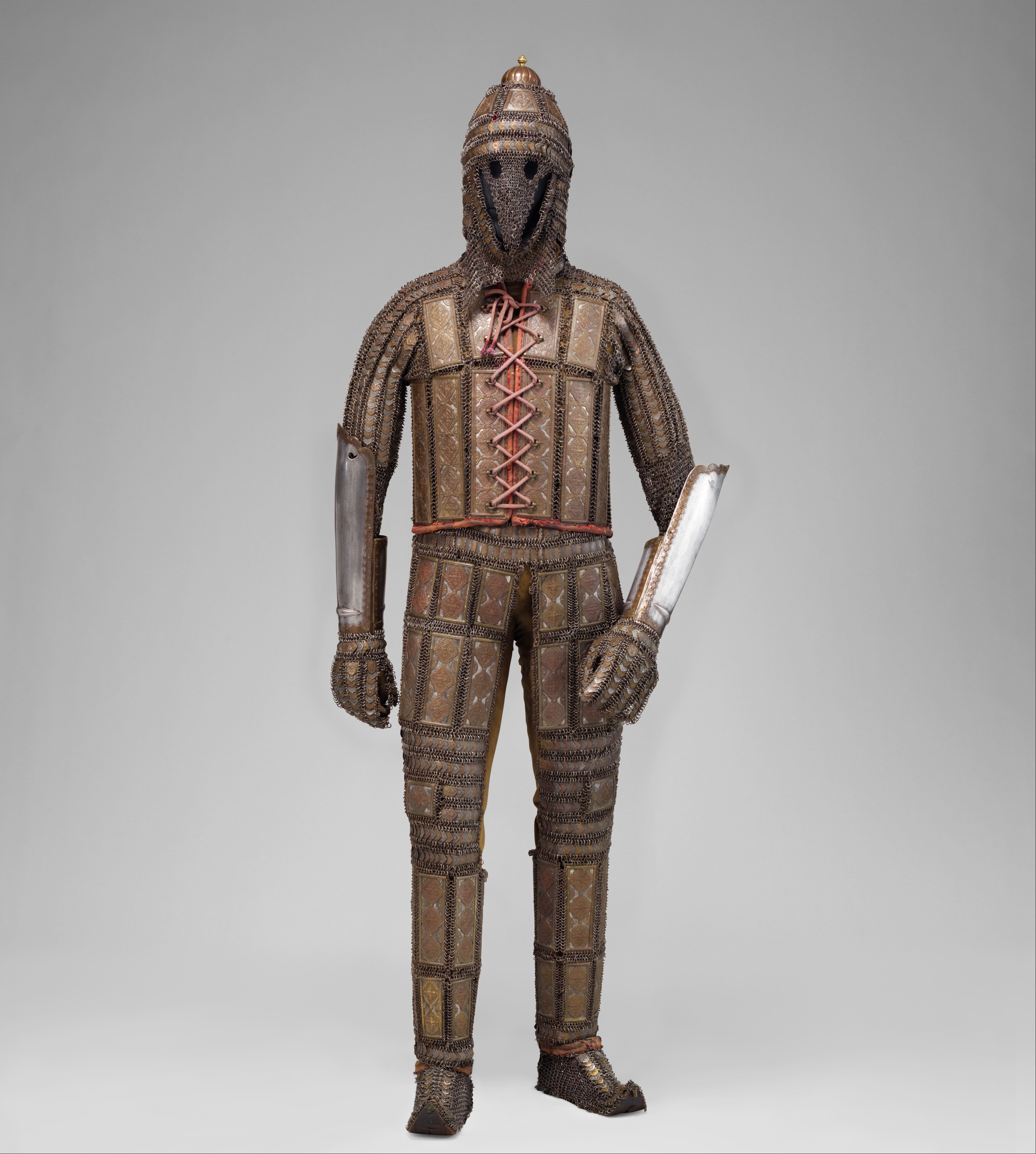
Sindhi Armor

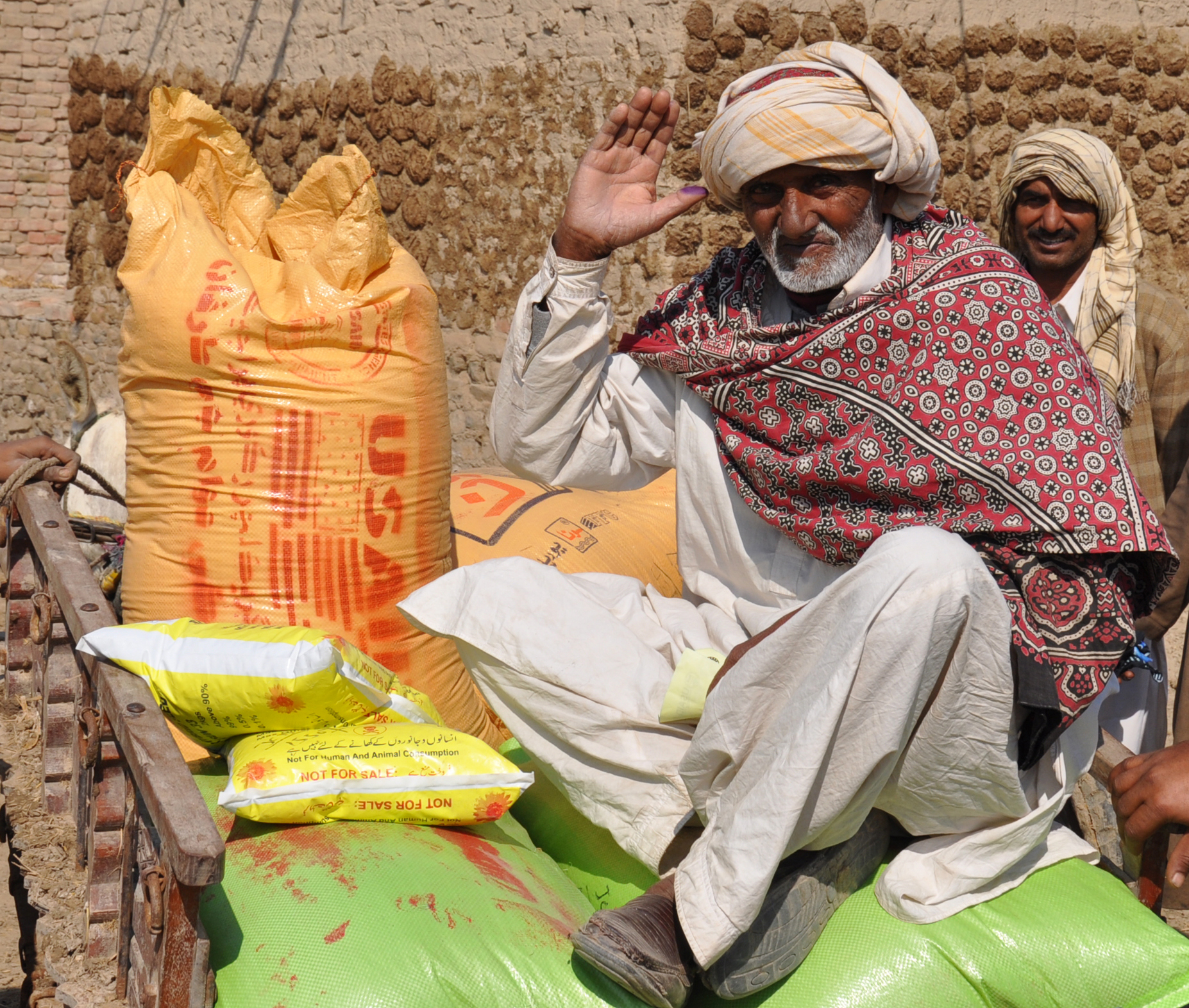
Elderly Sindhi man in Sindhi Salwar Kamis, Patko and Ajrak

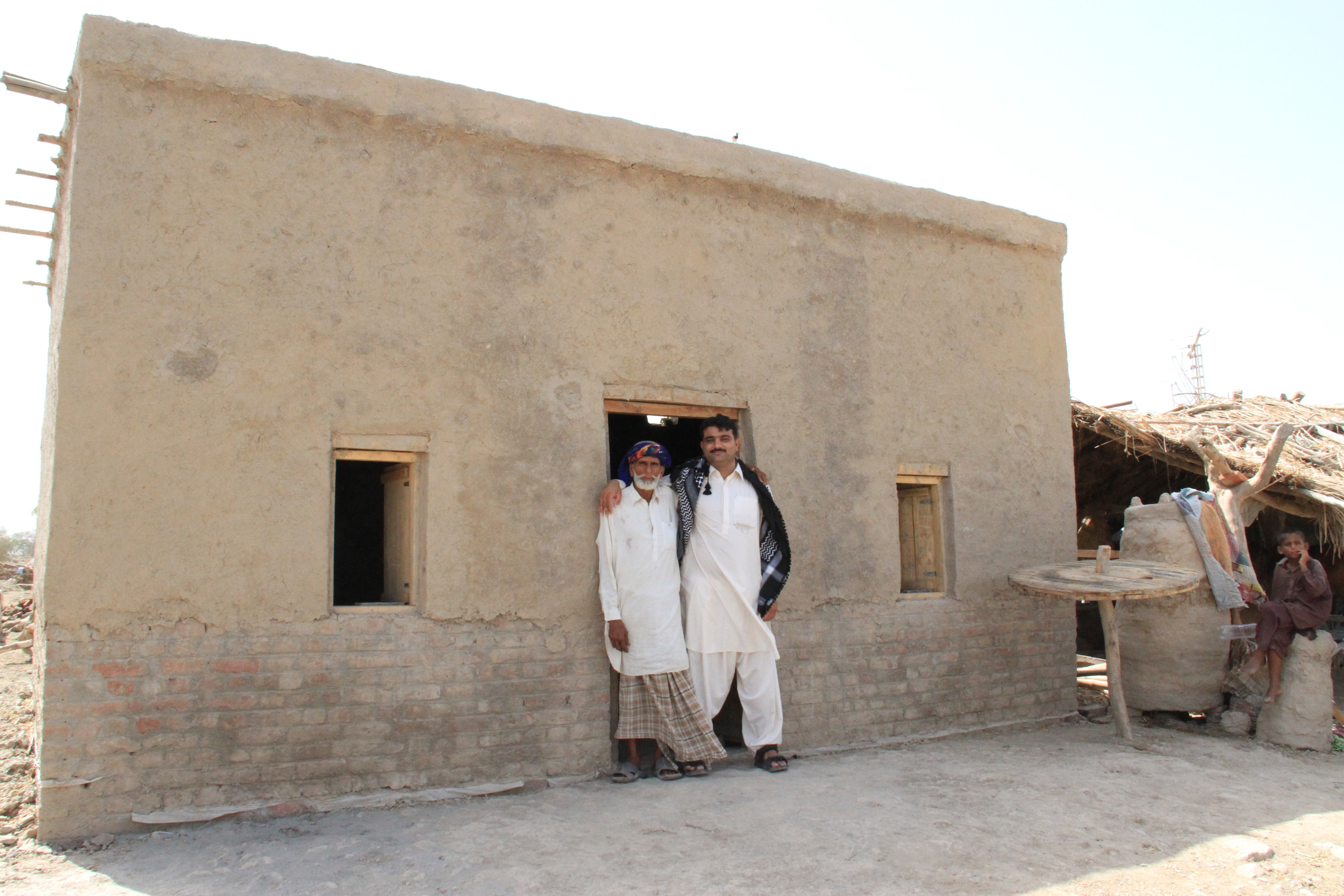
Two Sindhi men, one wearing Godd and Sindhi traditional floral rumal (handkerchief) as turban.

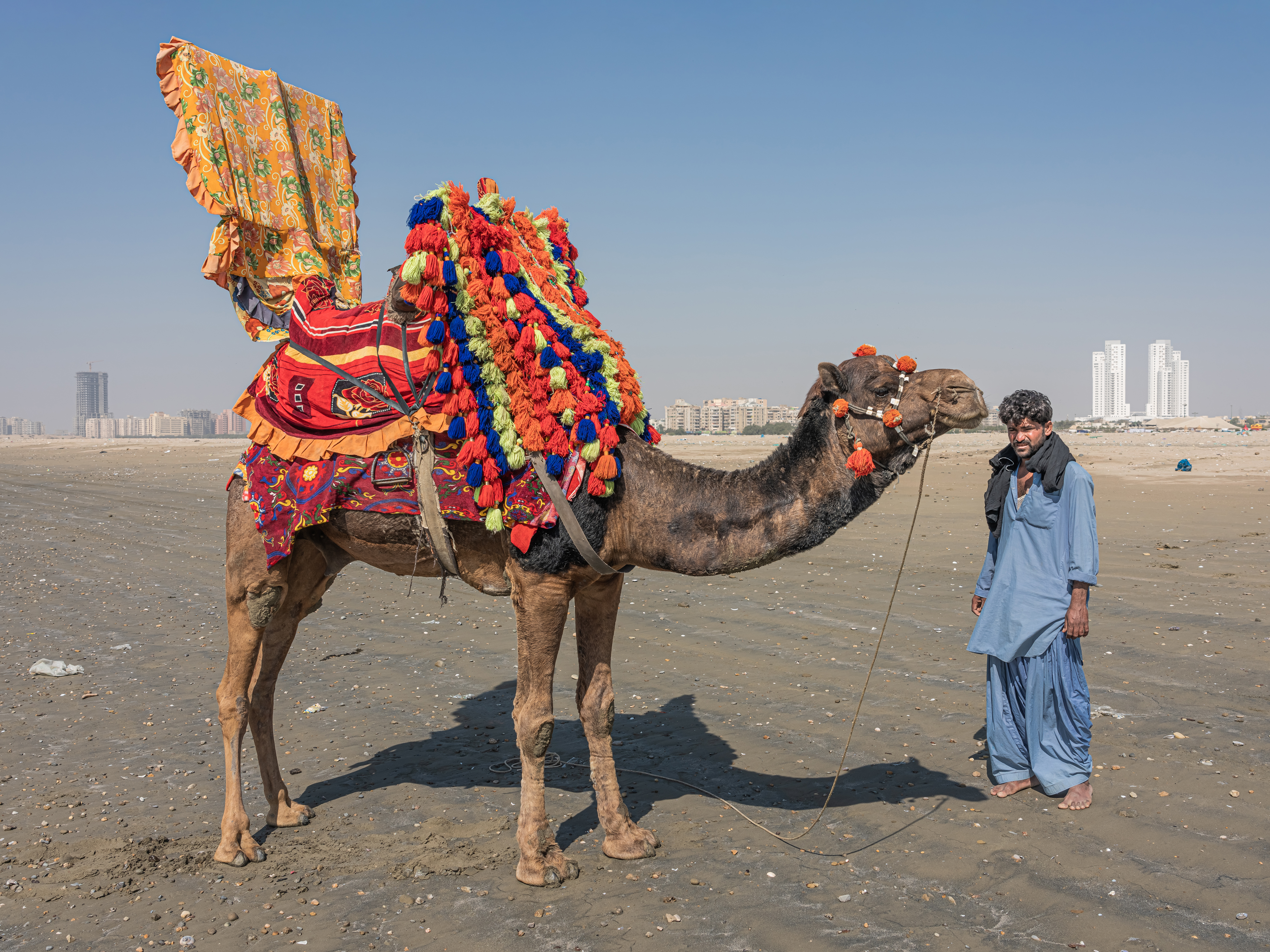
Sindhi man in Qamis and Kancha in Clifton beach, Karachi.

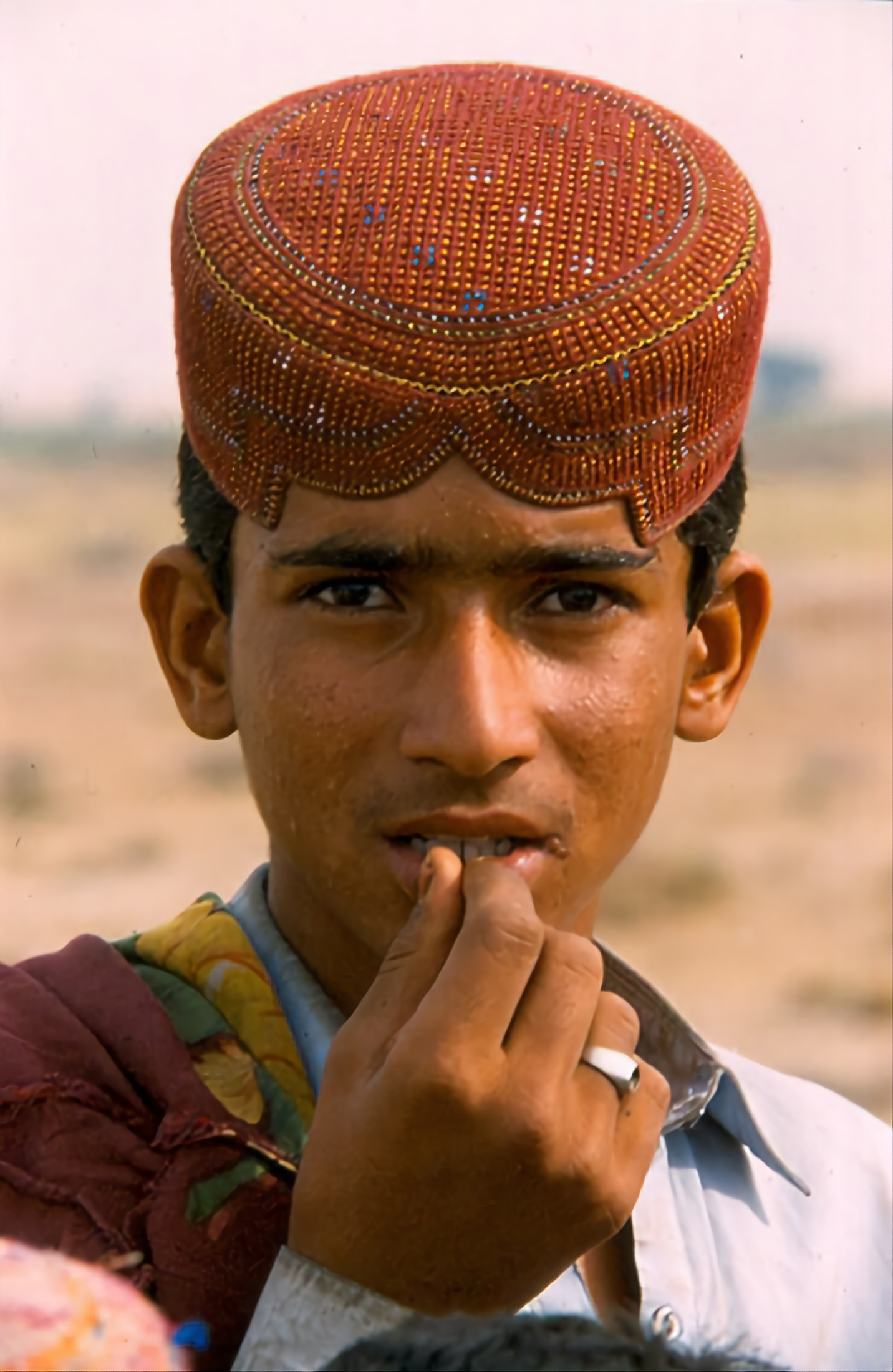
Sindhi boy wearing Sindhi topi (cap) and Sindhi rumal.

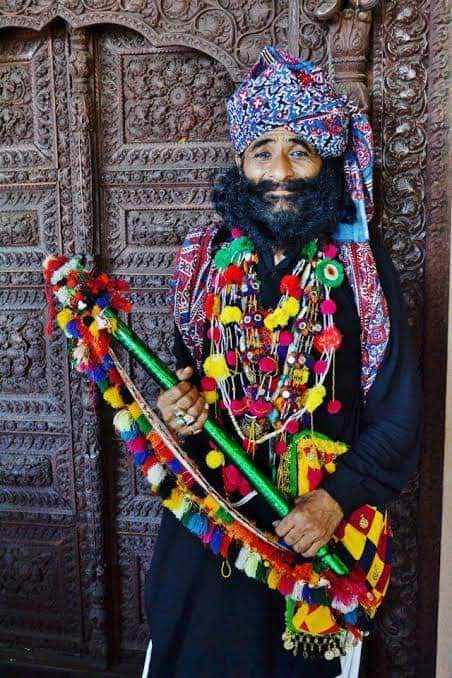
Sindhi Sufi singer in ajrak turban, Kantha necklaces, and tamburo musical instrument of Sindh.

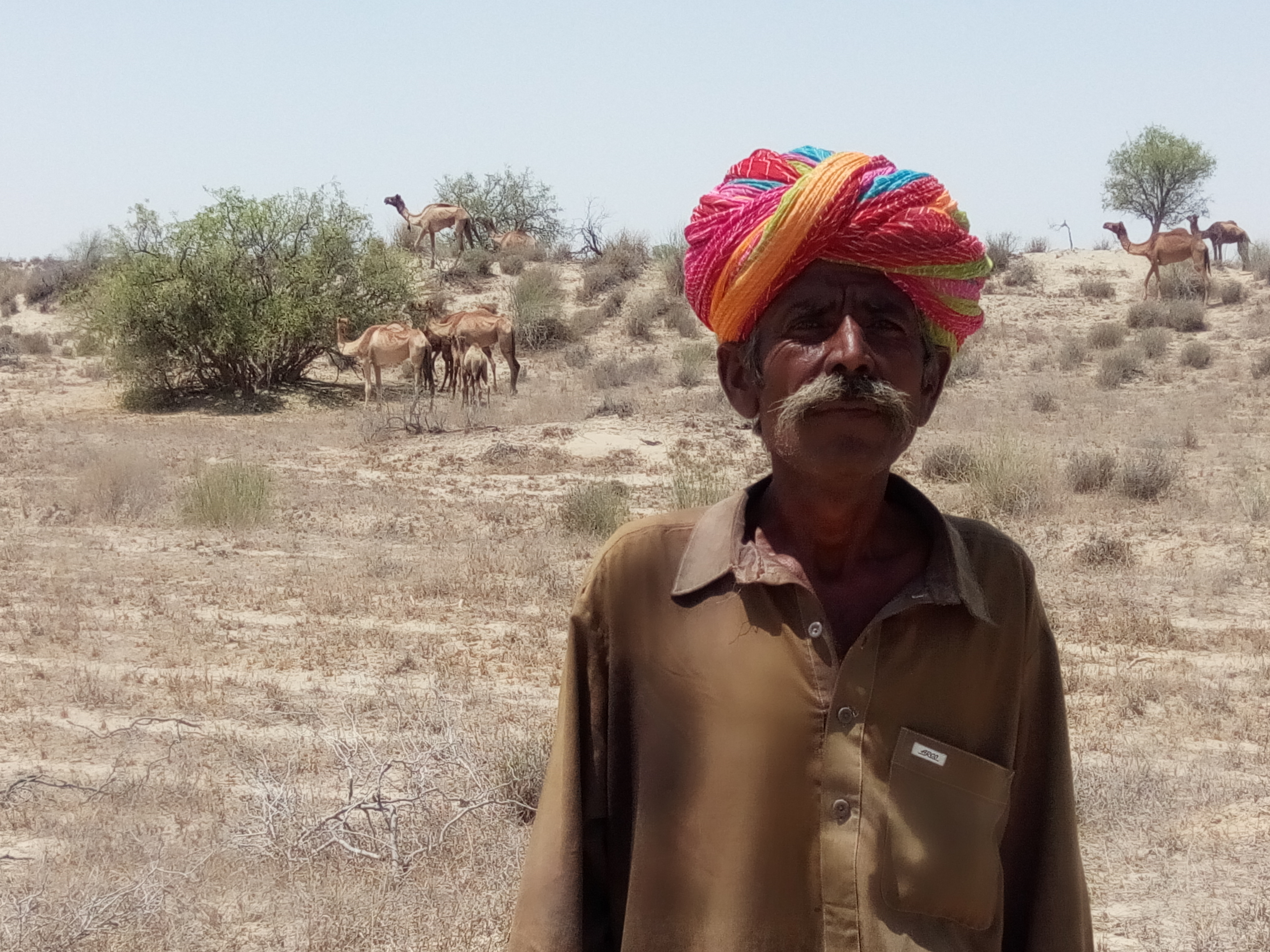
Elderly man of thar desert wearing Phentiyo/Phento turban.

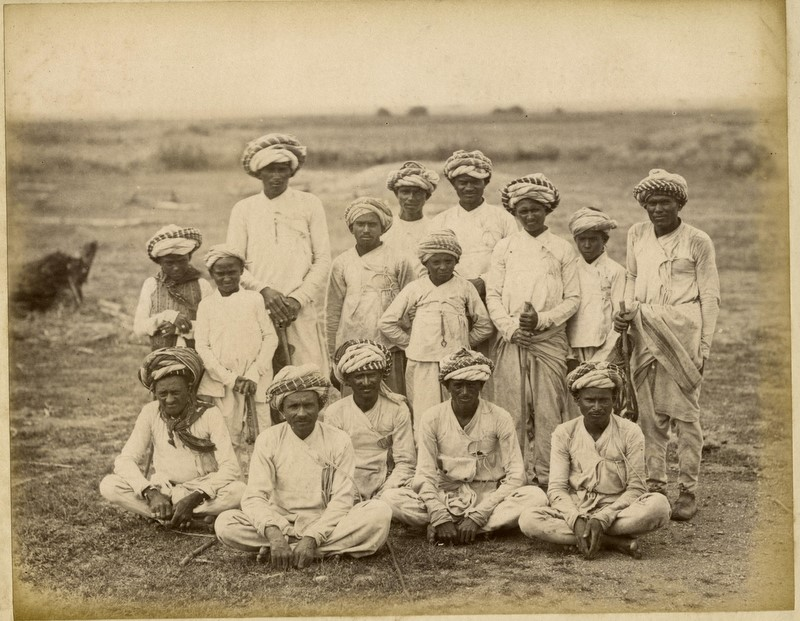
Men of thar desert in Sindh wearing Angelo.

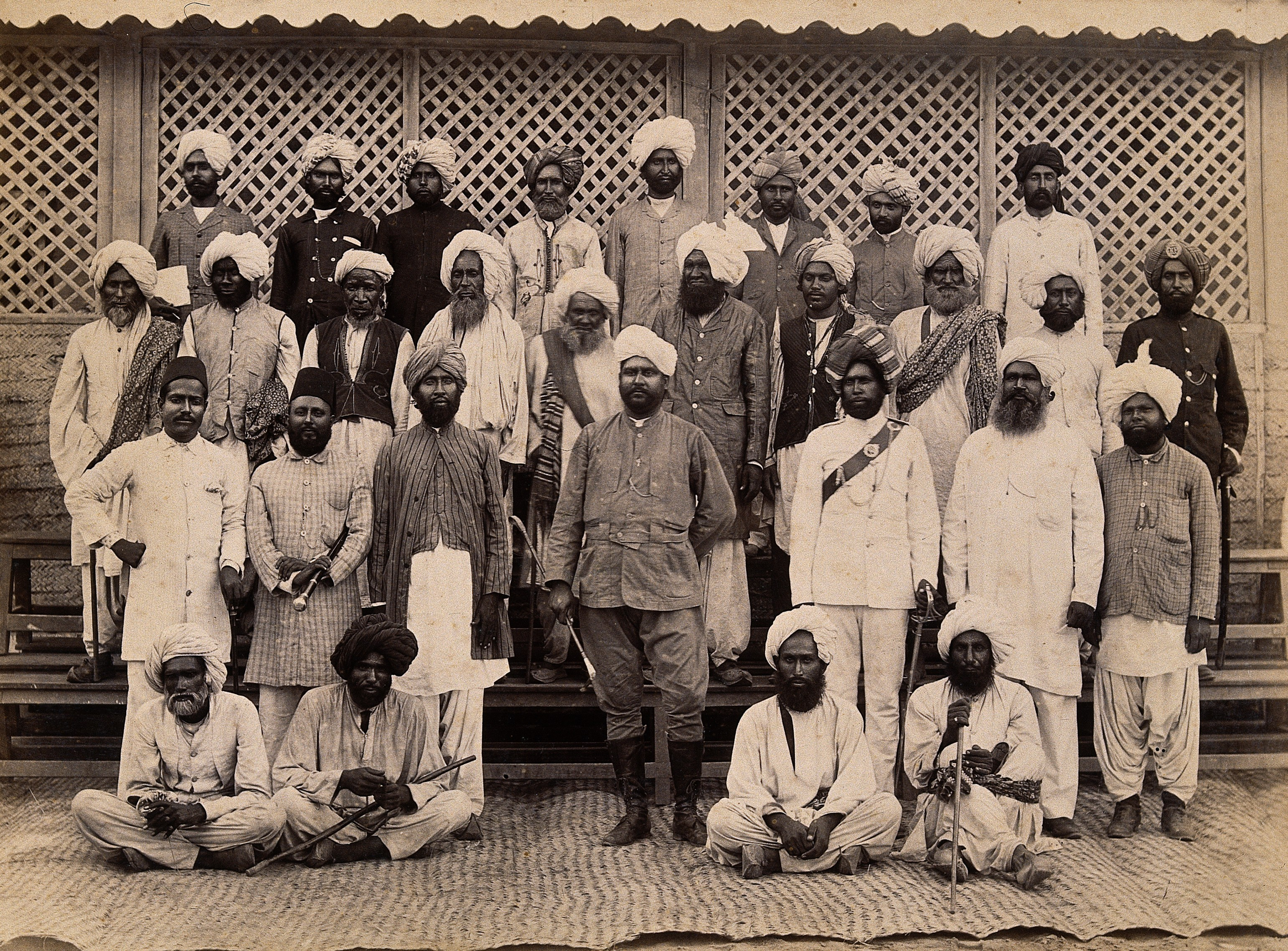
Group of men in Karachi.

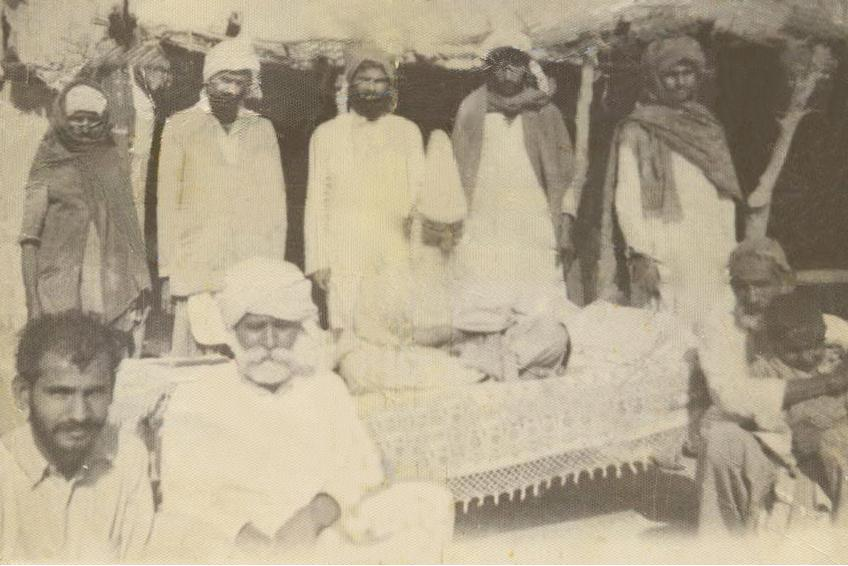
Sindhi Muslim men

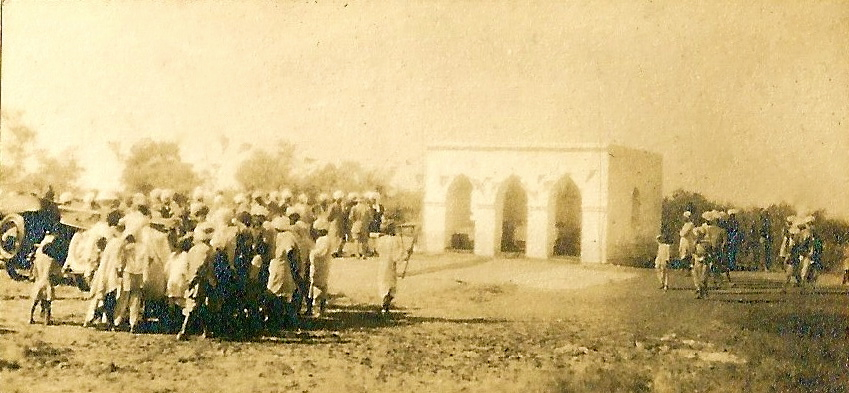
Men of Hyderabad, Sindh

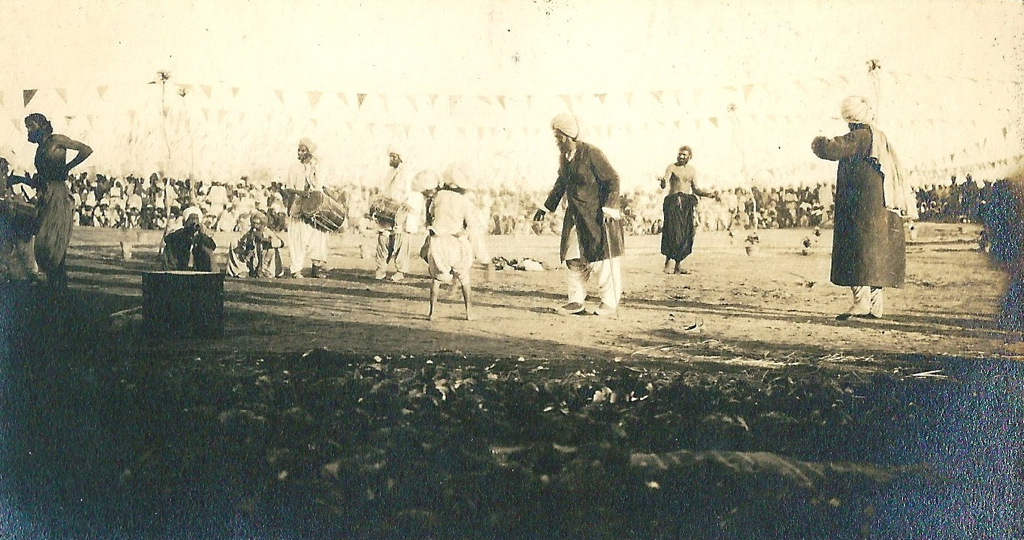
Sindhi men wrestling (Malakhro) in Hyderabad.

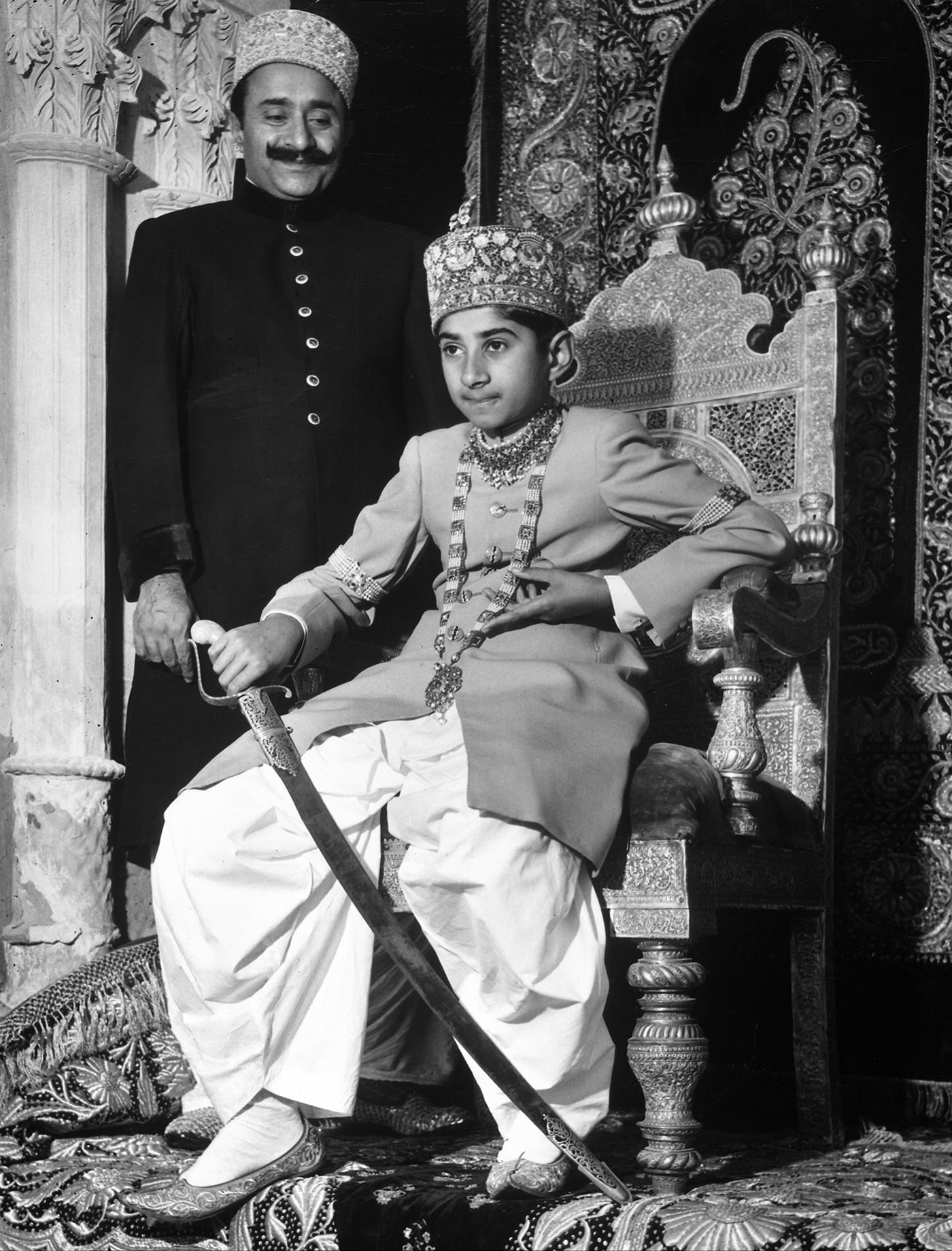
Talpur meers wearing Sherwanis and unique circular embroidered caps.

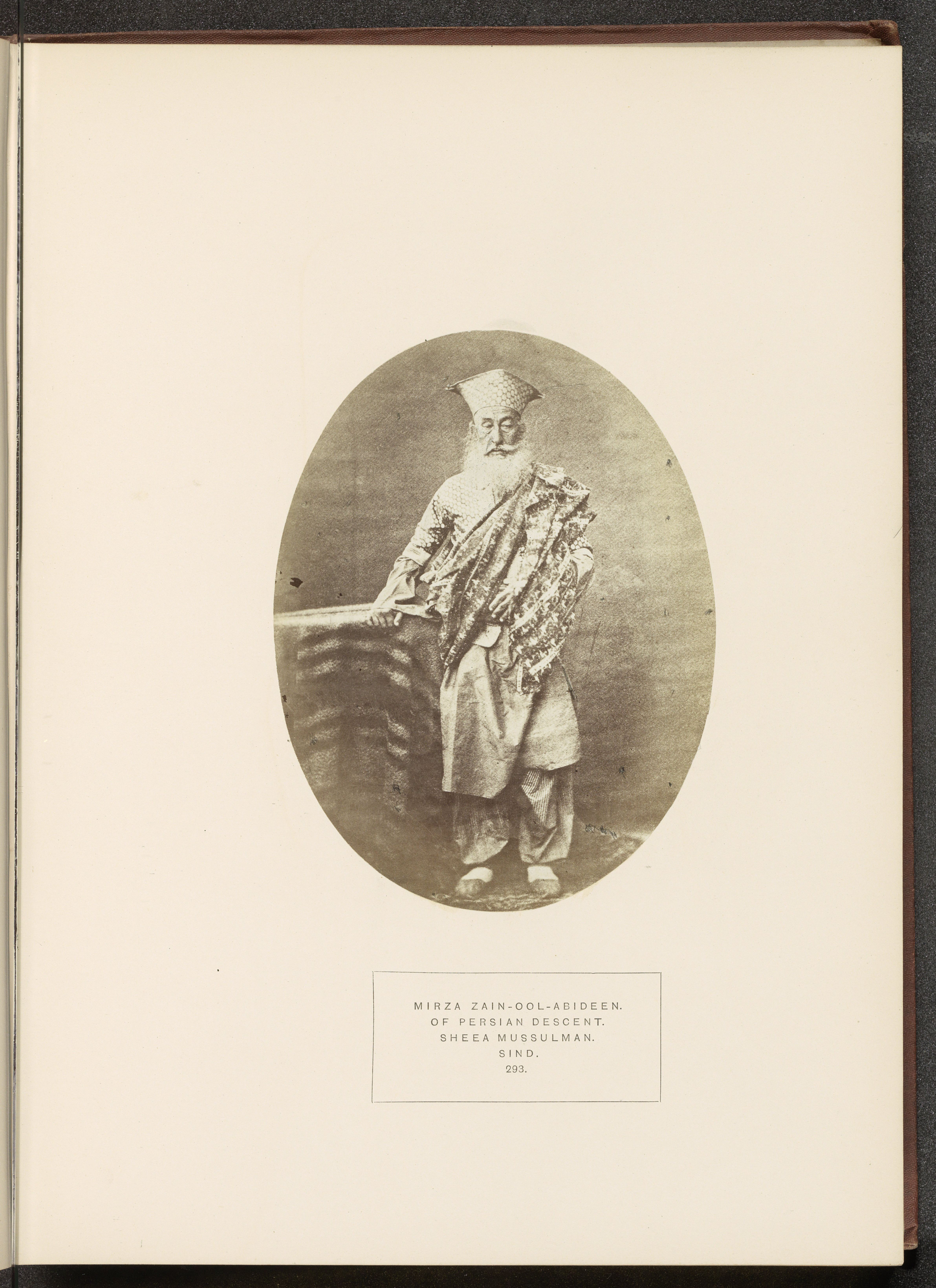
Portrait of an elderly man wearing unique hat probably Moghu hat.

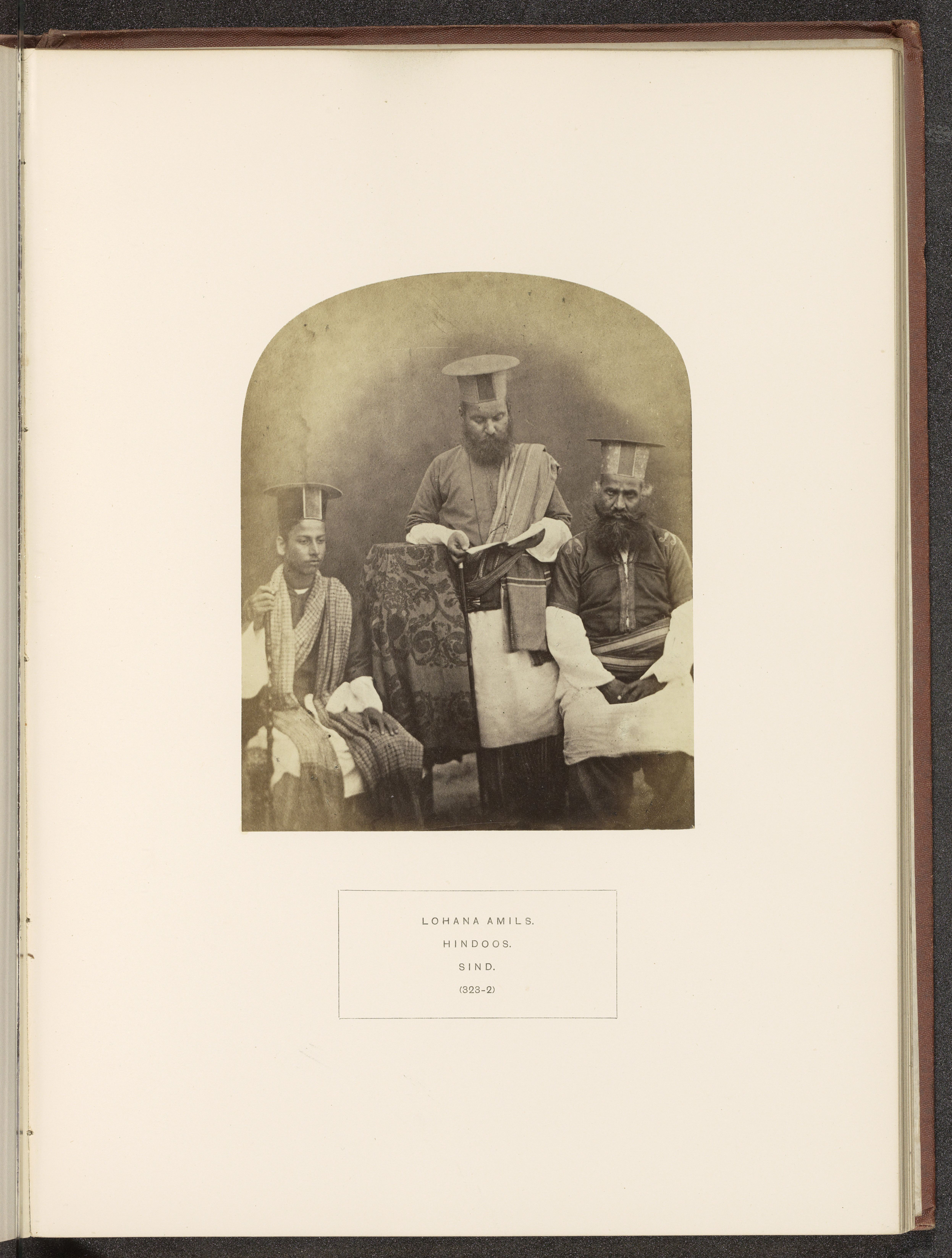
Portrait of Sindhi Lohana Amil men in Serai topi

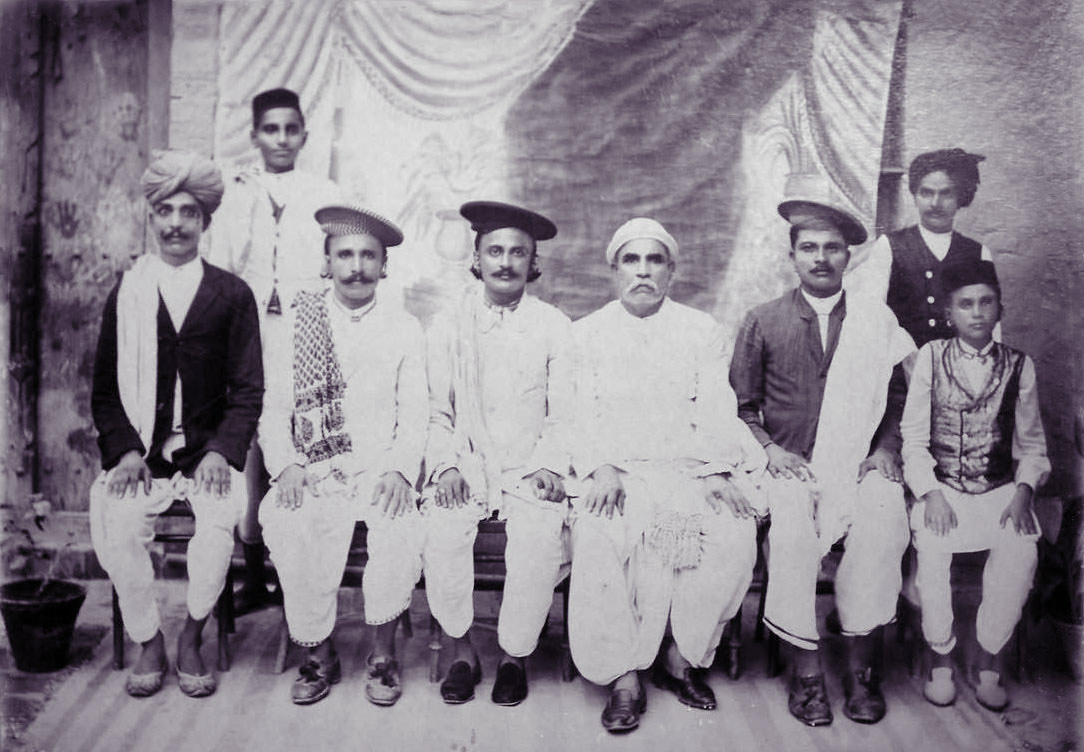
Vintage group photo of Sindhi Hindus.

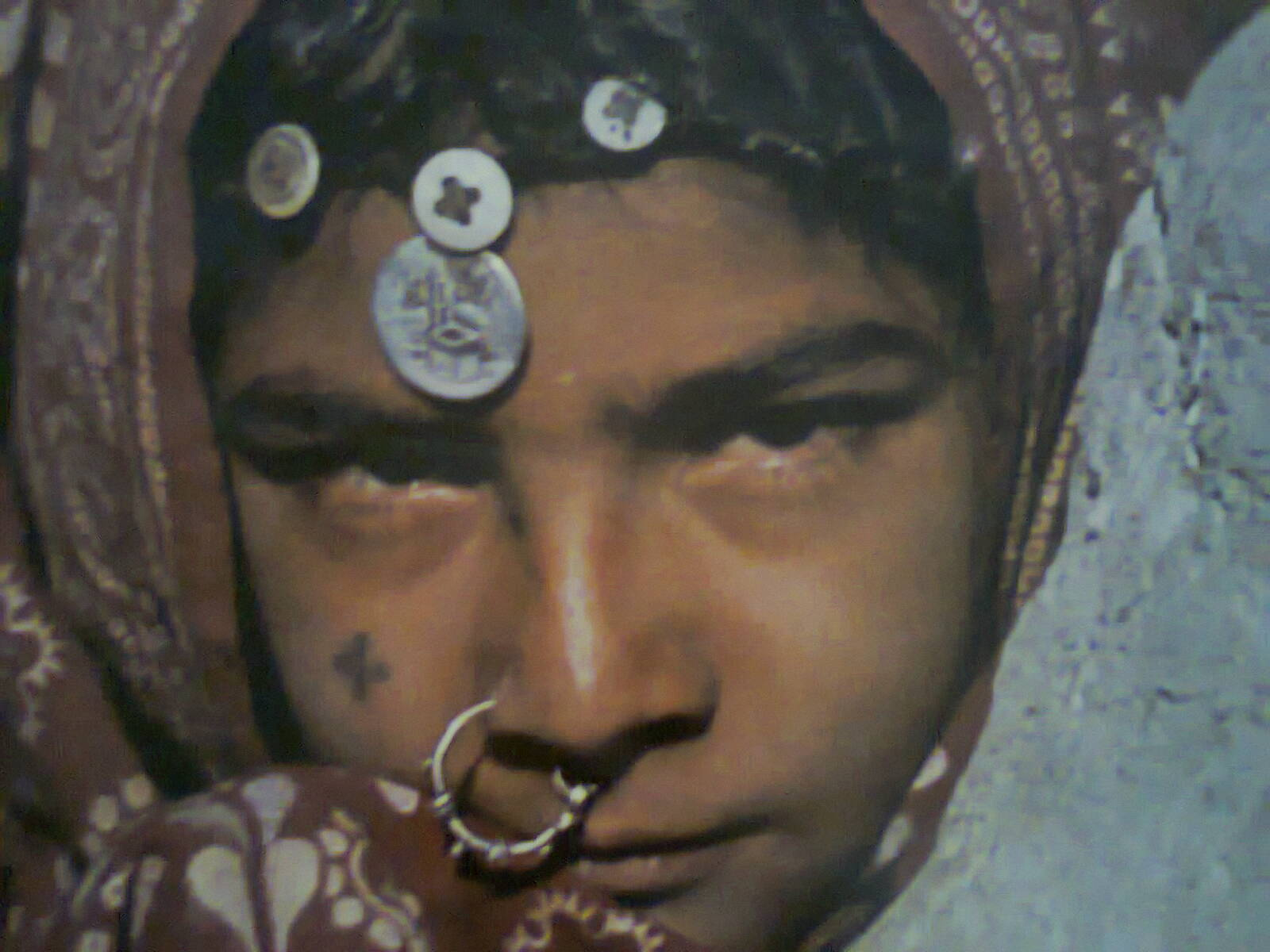
Sindhi tribal girl

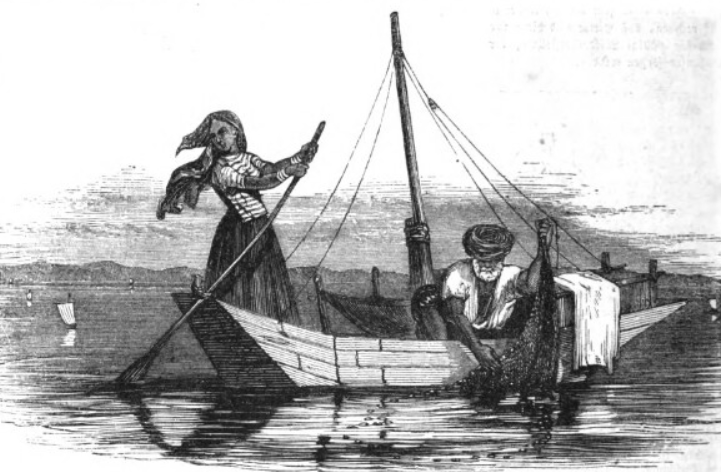
Sketch of Sindhi fisherman catching "Palla" fish.

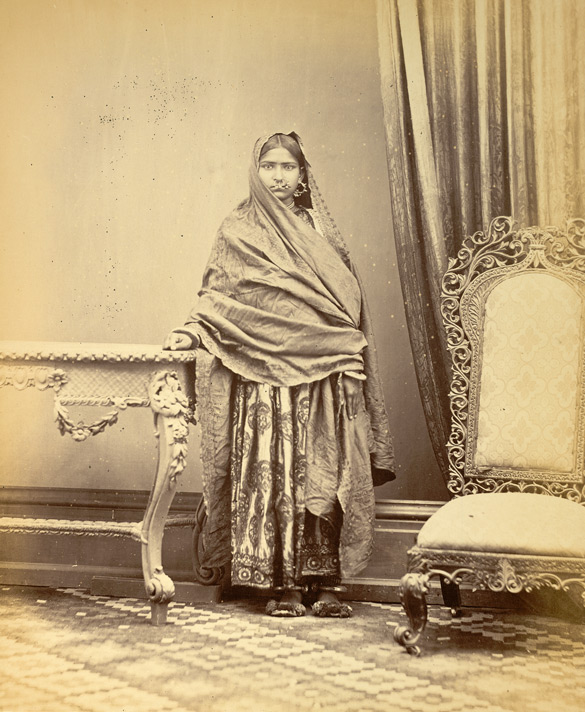
A Sindhi girl of Karachi

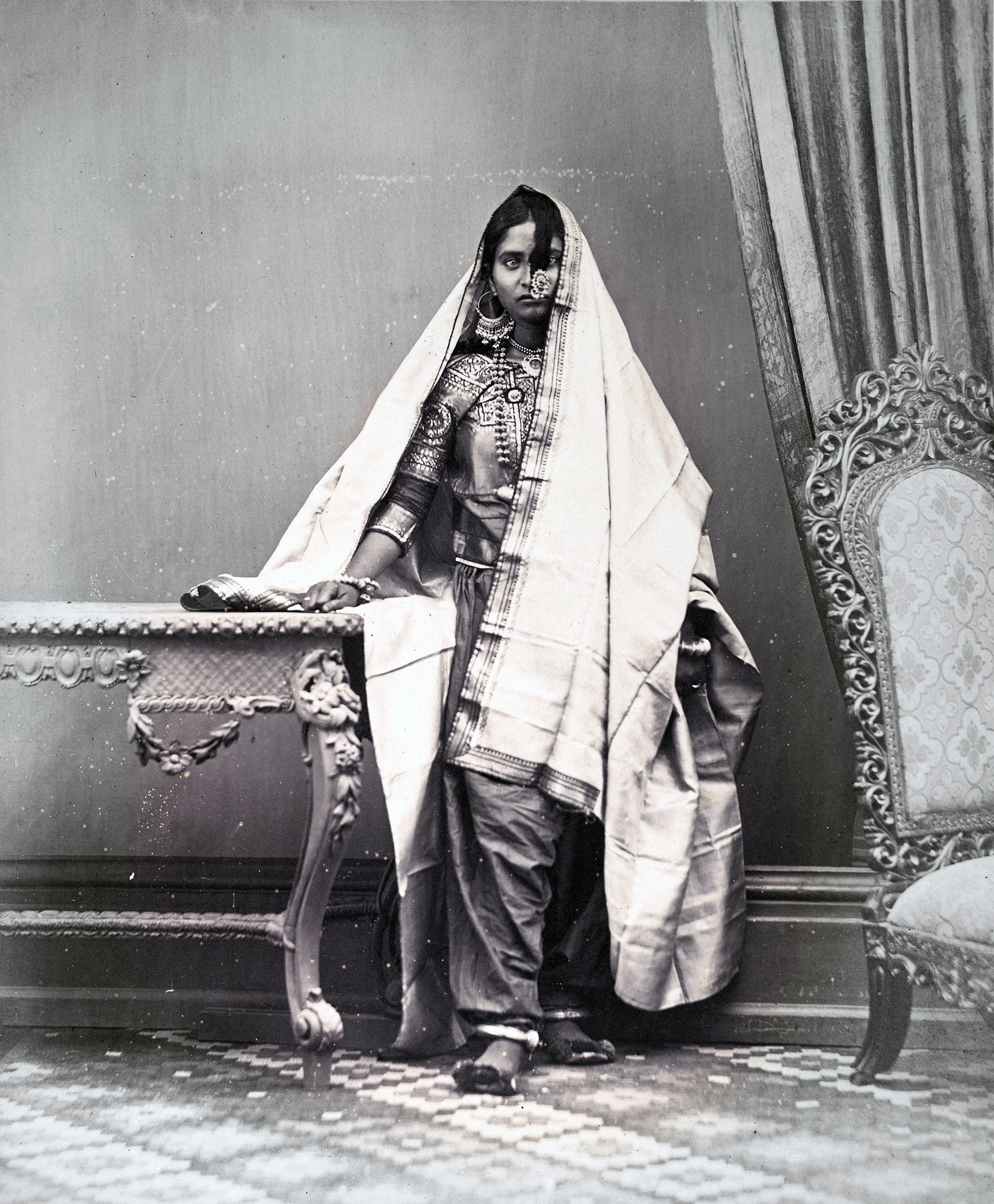
A girl from Karachi

A woman from Karachi

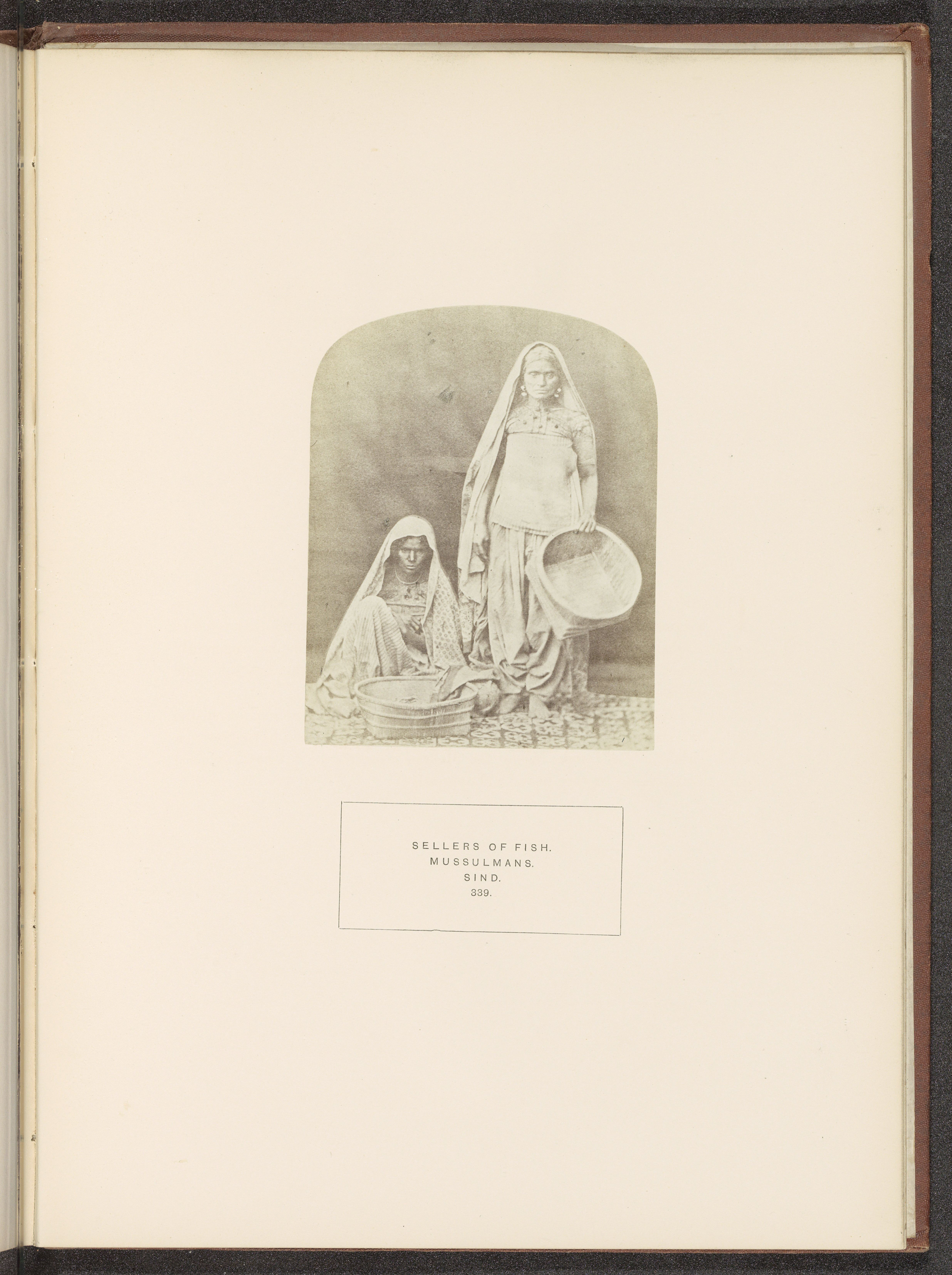
Sindhi fisherwomen

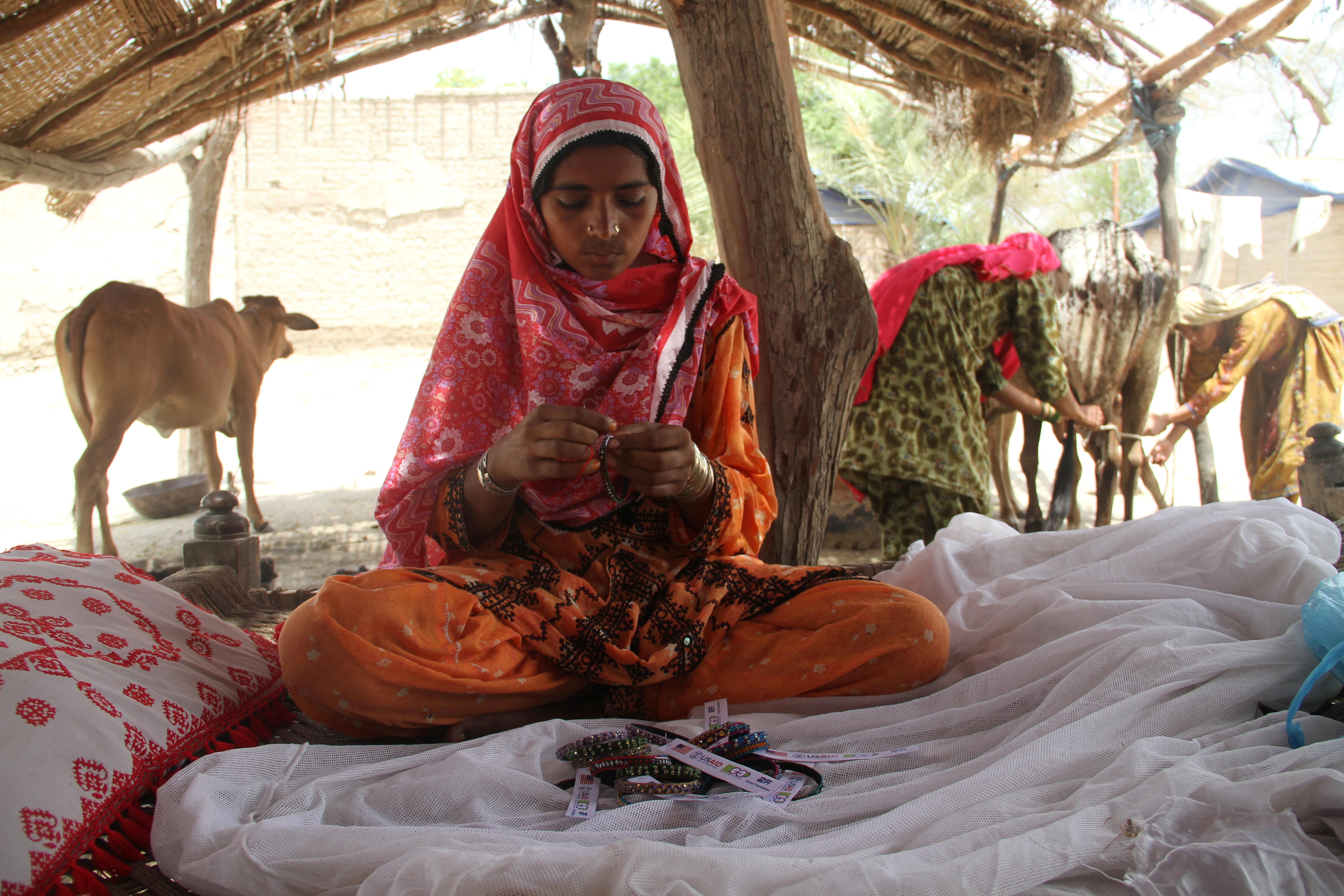
Sindhi girl from Kashmore.

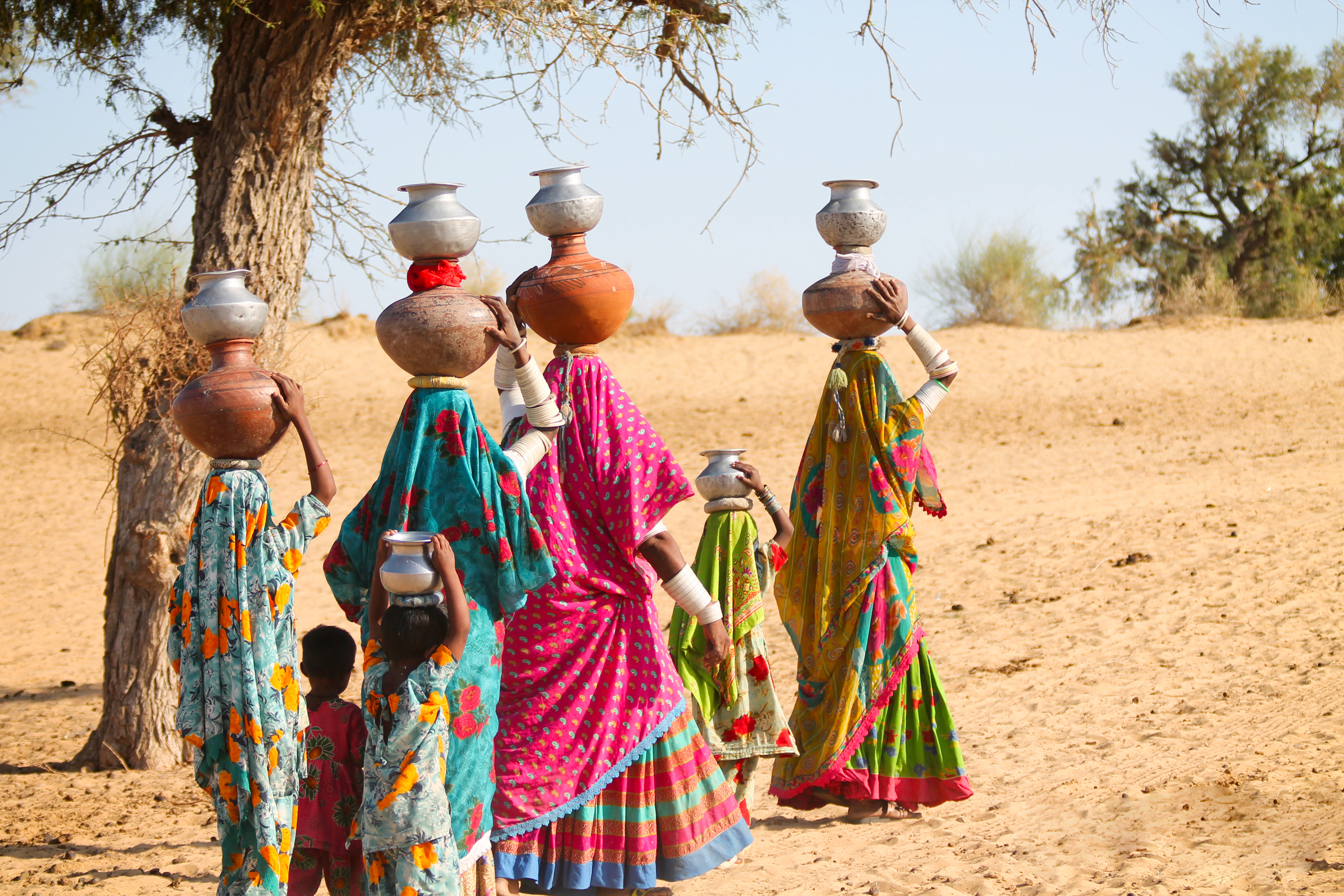
Women of Thar desert, Sindh

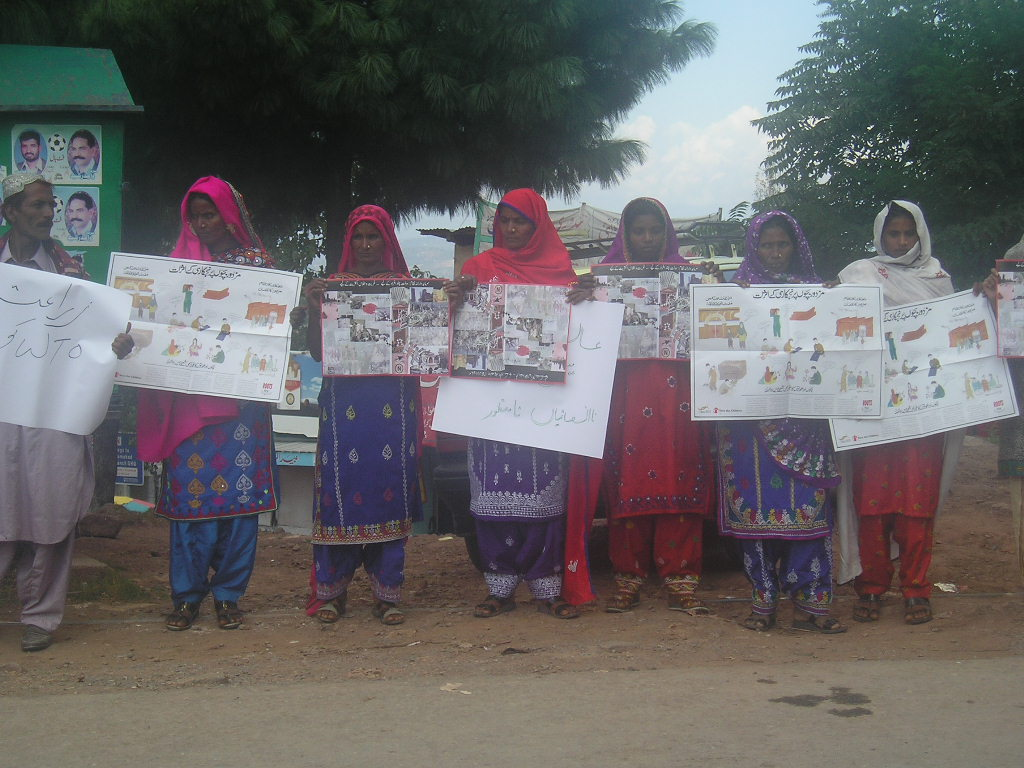
Sindhi Women in salwar, cholo and rao in traditional Sindhi embroideries.

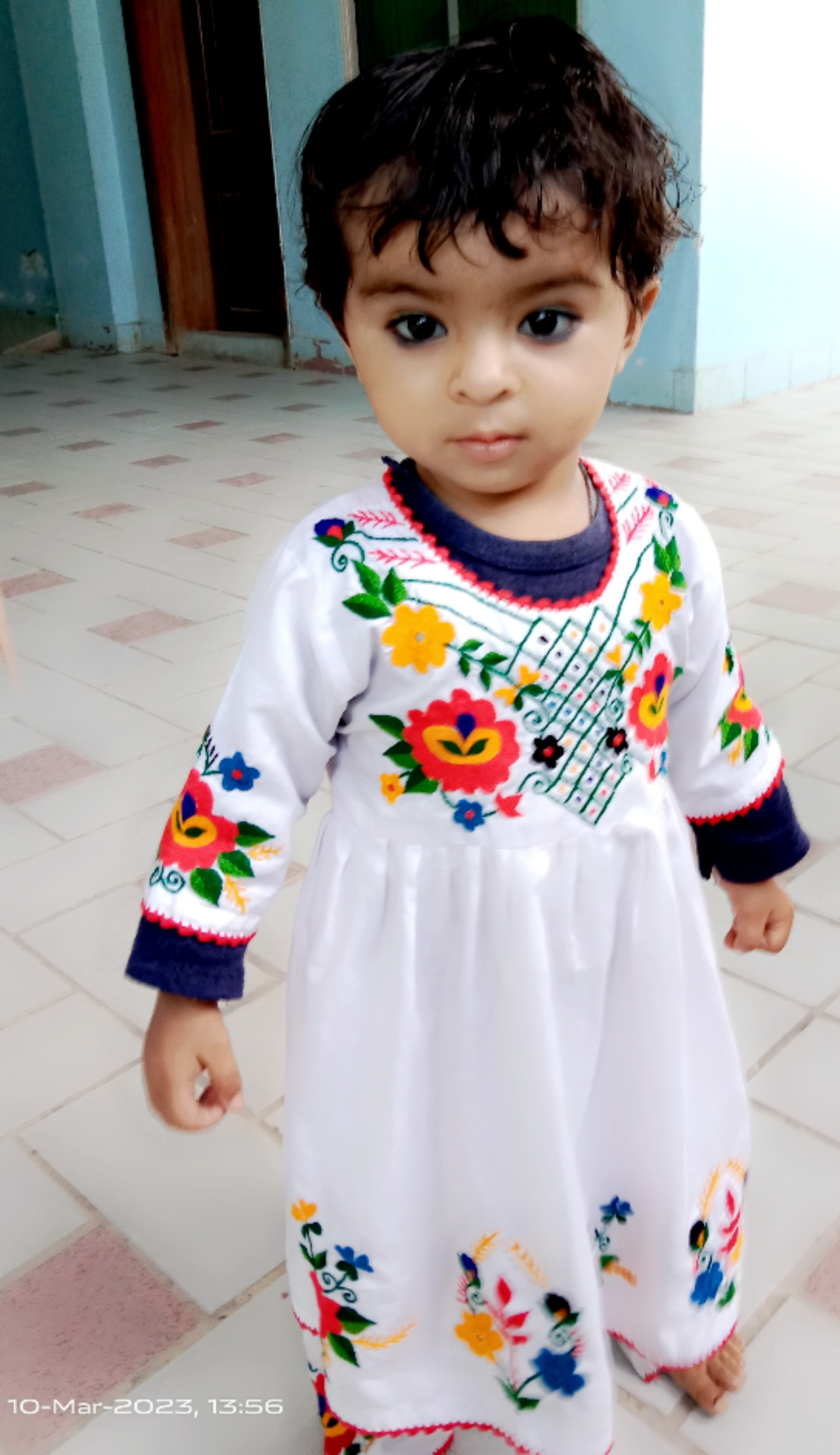
A girl dressed in Sindhi embroidered Frock.

== See also ==
- Punjabi clothing
