= Hirabad, Hyderabad =

Pakistani locality

Hirabad ہیرآباد
- Municipality
- Location in the Sindh, Pakistan
- Coordinates: 25°24′15.5635″N 68°21′57.8498″E
- Country: Pakistan
- Province: Sindh
- City: Hyderabad
- Settled: 1920s–1930s
- Demonym: Hirabadi
- Time zone: UTC+05:00 (PKST)

Hirabad (sometimes spelt Heerabad; Urdu: ﮨیر آباد; Sindhi: هير آباد; “Diamond Town”) is one of the oldest parts of the city of Hyderabad in Sindh, Pakistan. Before partition in 1947, Hirabad was a thriving township of wealthy Hindu Sindwork merchants and traders who generally belonged to the Amil and Bhaiband castes of Hindu Lohanas.

== History ==
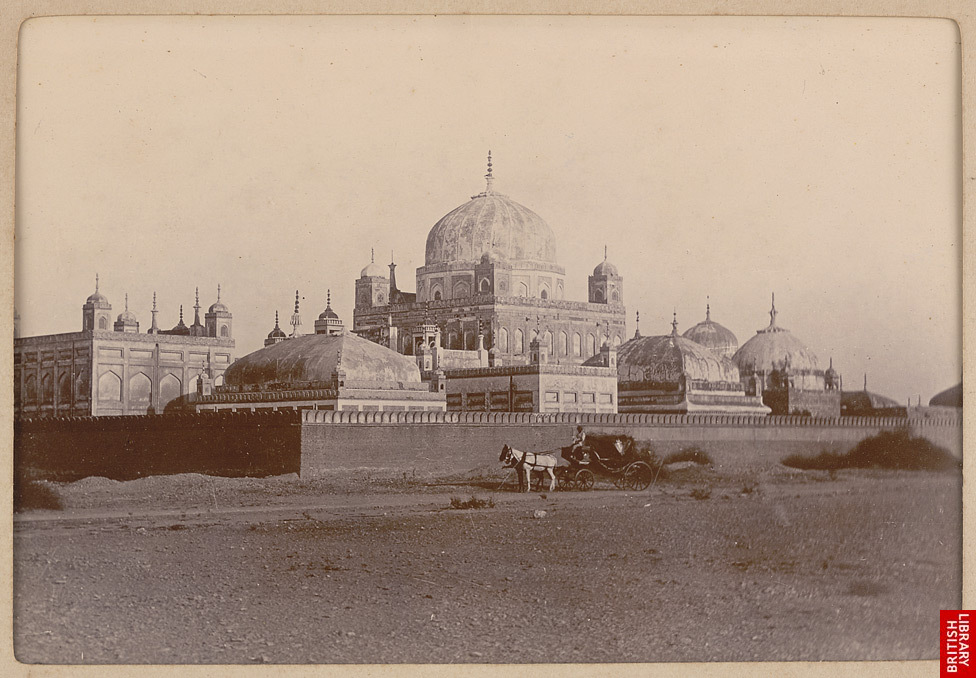
Tombs of Talpur Mirs (or cubbas; c. 1900), a few decades before the development of Hirabad.

Before its development and eventual occupation, the geography of Hirabad mainly consisted dry field plains with a sparse distribution of hillocks. The Talpur dynasty of Sindh saw it as a favourable place to erect magnificent mausoleums for their family, not much farther from the Sindh’s capital Hyderabad. For some time, these were the only structures in the area until the land was used to develop a new residential locality.

=== Late 19th and early 20th century ===
The Hyderabad taluka was a mofussil (small town) and had a large population of Sindhi Hindu Lohanas, an Indian caste of merchants and traders. Chiefly amongst these were the Amils and Bhaibands. The Amils were a well-educated and travelled people who occupied the uppermost rung of the social ladder, whilst the Bhaibands were considered slightly less polished. There was a lesser population of Muslims who had been converted, after Muhammad bin Qasim's conquest of Sindh, principally from Bhaibands and had adopted Memon or Khatri (derived from Kshatriya) as their defining identity; these were mostly landowning zamindars.

The Amils and Bhaibands lived in the oldest part of the city, occupying whole streets in the bazaar area (now Shahi Bazaar) of Hyderabad, and were mostly Sindwork merchants and traders who spent much of their time abroad. In the mid-1930s, growing tensions following the Spanish Civil War adversely affected the operations of these merchants and they started returning to Hyderabad. This contributed to a sudden growth in the population of the town which resulted in “a considerable physical expansion”.

=== Development of Hirabad ===
The Hyderabad Municipality, having already drafted plans for town expansion since its constitution in 1853, started developing a new residential neighbourhood, north of the old city bazaar, in order to accommodate the growing numbers of people. Finally settled in the 1920s and 1930s, this new residential area started being called Hirabad (lit. "town of diamonds"), known so for its inhabitants who were mainly bankers, clerks and jewellers.

Seeing this as an opportunity to set themselves apart, the Amils relocated to this newly developed neighbourhood. Some Bhaibands and wealthier merchant firms followed, but still considered the older town a more favourable location even when Hirabad boasted better drainage facilities and electricity. As these rich merchants moved into the locality, they had “palatial mansions” built for themselves. It was because of this extravagance that the Hyderabadis were considered “‘townies’ with ‘refined taste’”.

=== Post-partition migration ===
Following the Partition of British India, many Sindhi Hindus migrated from Sindh to the Hindu-majority areas of India, leaving behind their homes and properties. Their departure coincided with the arrival of Muslim refugees from India who settled in Hyderabad. The vacated houses were soon occupied by these migrants, many of whom had lost their own homes and possessions during the upheaval. Lacking the means or resources to maintain the properties, many of the formerly well-preserved buildings gradually fell into disrepair.

The Hindu Sindworkis of Hyderabad liquidated whatever assets they had and left their homeland with all the belongings, losing all their immovable properties in Hyderabad. It was easier for these families to move from one place to another as their livelihood remained intact and “[Sindh] was not at all an essential part of their business operations”. A large number of Hyderabadi Amils and other Sindhi Hindu elites moved to Bombay and settled there as professionals or civil servants, however it was significantly harder for the Bhaibands and other lesser castes to weather the consequences of the partition. In present times Sindhi and Urdu speakers are the dominant ethnicities of Hirabad.
