= Sahiti (Lohana) =

Subcaste from Sindh, Pakistan

Sahiti or Sahta sometimes Sahitiaja are sub-group/caste of Lohana community, Sahitis (also known as Sahitas or Sayta) and, together with the Amils and Bhaiband, form one of the three major groups of Lohana caste of Sindh.

Sahitis are mostly in occupied in supplying dry fruit, general foodstuff and textiles. Sindhi Hindus are mainly divided into Amils, Bhaibands, Hyderabadi Bhaiband (Sindhi Varki), Sahitiaja, Shikarpuri, Hatvaniya, Thattai, Bhagnari etc.
