= Haji Rabri =

- Location in Shahi Bazaar, Hyderabad

Restaurant information
- Established: 1948
- Owner: hunain shekhani
- Food type: Rabri
- Location: Shahi Bazaar, Hyderabad, Sindh, Pakistan
- Coordinates: 25°23′11.53″N 68°22′23.19″E
- Website: hajirabri.pk

Haji Rabri (Urdu: حاجی ربڑی) is an old rabri maker based in Shahi Bazaar, Hyderabad, Sindh. Along with Bombay Bakery cakes, Haji Rabri is considered as an identity of Hyderabad.

== History ==
Haji Rabri was founded in 1948 by Haji Bashiruddin in Hyderabad, Sindh. The Haji family are from India and they migrated to Hyderabad from Rewari after the partition of India. They founded their first shop in Shahi Bazaar, Hyderabad.

In 2012, Haji Rabri shop was opened in Karachi.

== See also ==
- Bombay Bakery
