= Khudabadi script =

Abugida

Khudabadi khudābādī 𑊻𑋩𑋣𑋏𑋠𑋔𑋠𑋏𑋢
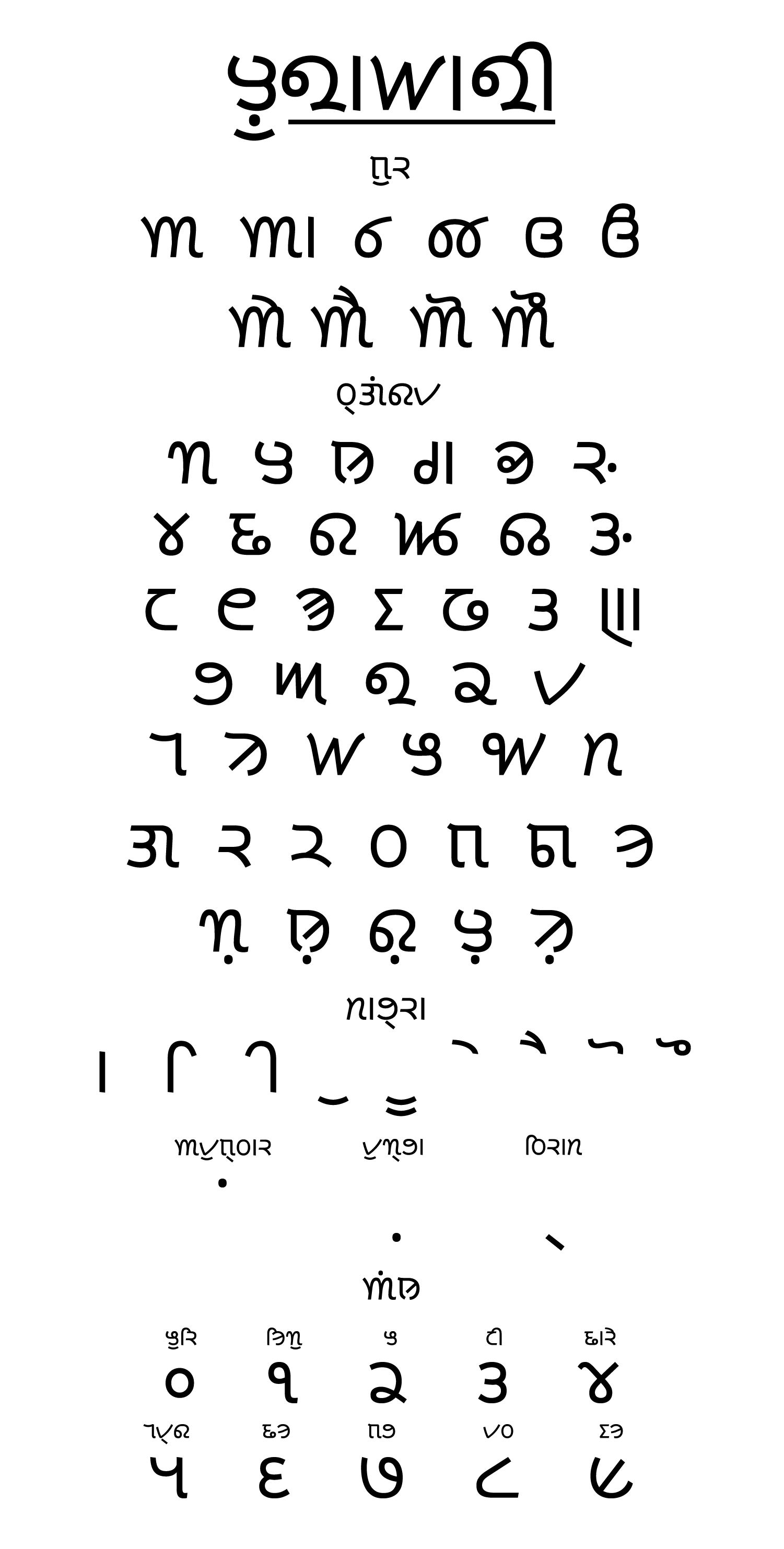
- The Khudabadi Alphabet Chart divided into 10 Vowels, 37 Basic Consonants, 5 additional Consonants, 9 Vowel diacritics, 3 special diacritic marks and Khudabadi specific numerals 0-9
- Script type: Abugida
- Period: c. 16th century–present
- Direction: Left-to-right
- Languages: Sindhi language

Related scripts
- Parent systems: Proto-Sinaitic alphabet: Phoenician alphabet; Aramaic alphabet; Brāhmī; Gupta; Śāradā; Laṇḍā; Khudabadi
- Sister systems: Gurumukhi, Khojki, Mahajani, Multani

ISO 15924
- ISO 15924: Sind (318), Khudawadi, Sindhi

Unicode
- Unicode alias: Khudawadi
- Unicode range: U+112B0–U+112FF

Khudabadi (Sindhi: 𑊻𑋩𑋣𑋏𑋠𑋔𑋠𑋏𑋢, romanized: khudābādī), also known as Khudawadi (Sindhi: 𑊻𑋩𑋣𑋏𑋠𑋛𑋠𑋏𑋢, romanized: khudāvādī), is a Landa script used to write the Sindhi language, sometimes used by some Sindhi Hindus even in the present-day. The script originates from Khudabad, a city in Sindh, and is named after it. Khudabadi is one of the four scripts used for writing Sindhi, the others being Perso-Arabic, Khojki and Devanagari script. It was used by Sindhi Workies (traders and merchants) to record their information and rose to importance as the script began to be used to record information kept secret from other non-Sindhi groups.

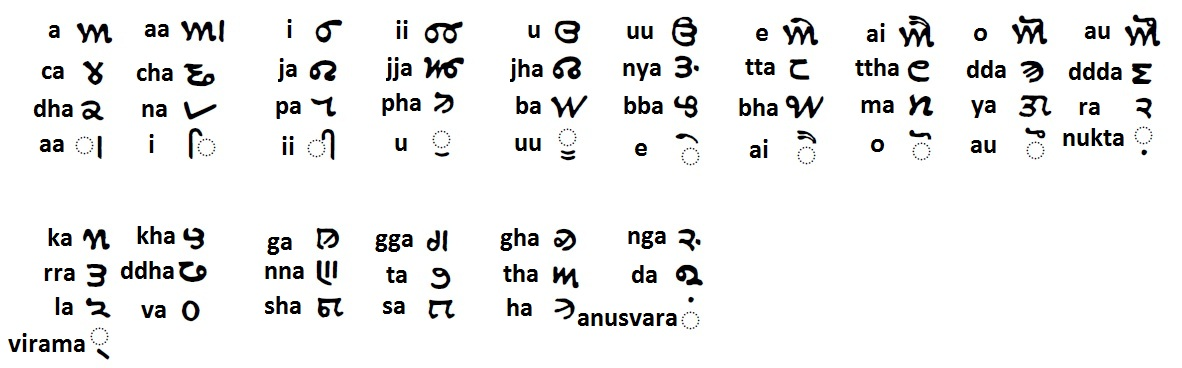
Chart of the Khudabadi Script

== History ==
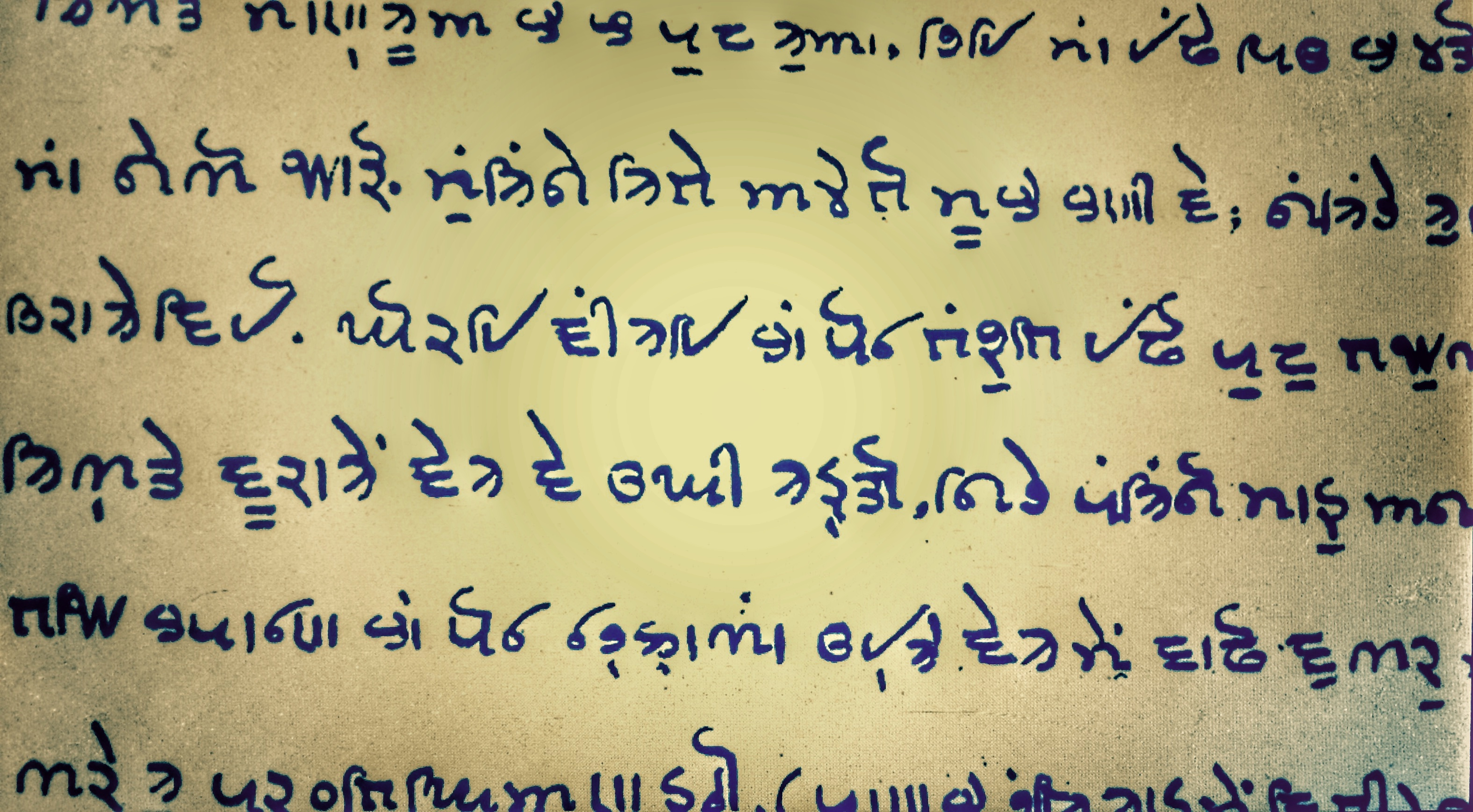
Extract from the Parable of the Prodigal Son in 'improved' Khudawadi-script Sindhi, from the Linguistic Survey of India by George Grierson (1919, p. 101)

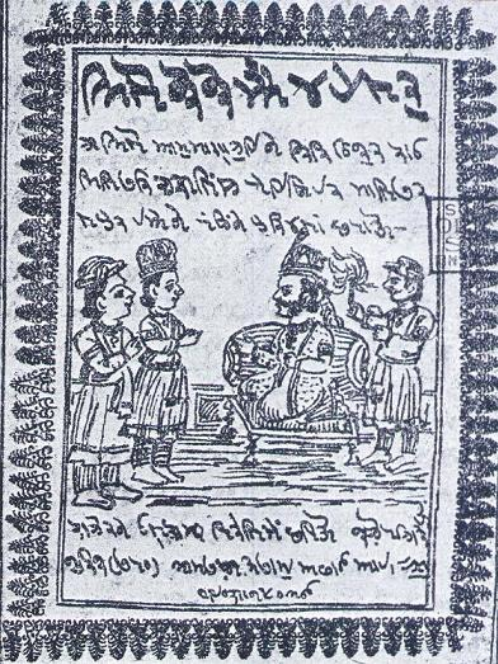
Cover page of a book written in Standard Sindhi (Khudabadi)

The Khudabadi script has roots in the Brahmi script, like those of most Indian, Tibetan, and Southeast Asian languages. The Khudabadi script was created by the Sindhi diaspora residing in Khudabad to send written messages to their relatives, who lived in their hometowns. Due to its simplicity, the use of this script spread very quickly and got acceptance in other Sindhi groups for sending written letters and messages. It continued to be in use for very long period of time. Because it was originated from Khudabad, it was called Khudabadi script. The Sindhi traders started maintaining their accounts and other business books in this new script. The knowledge of Khudabadi script became important for employing people who intend to go to overseas so that their business accounts and books can be kept secret from foreign people and government officials. Schools started teaching the Sindhi language in Khudabadi script.

After Mir Nasir Khan Talpur's defeat, British rule commenced in Sindh. When the British arrived they found the Pandits writing Sindhi in Devanagari, Hindu women using Gurmukhi, government servants using Perso-Arabic script and traders keeping their business records in Khudabadi which was completely unknown to the British at the time. The British called it 'Hindu Sindhi' to differentiate it from Sindhi written in the Perso-Arabic script. The British scholars found the Sindhi language to be closer to Sanskrit and said that the Devanagari script would be suitable for it while the government servants favoured the Arabic script since they did not know Devanagari and had to learn it. A debate began, with Captain Richard Francis Burton favoring the Arabic script and Captain Stack favouring Devanagari.

Sir Bartle Frere, the Commissioner of Sindh, then referred the matter to the Court of Directors of the British East India Company, which directed that:

- The Sindhi Language in Arabic Script to be used for government office use, on the ground that Muslim names could not be written in Devanagari.
- The Education Department should give the instructions to the schools in the script of Sindhi which can meet the circumstance and prejudices of the Mohammadan and Hindu. It is thought necessary to have Arabic Sindhi Schools for Muslims where the Arabic Script will be employed for teaching and to have Hindu Sindhi Schools for Hindus where the Khudabadi Script will be employed for teaching.

In the year 1868, the Bombay Presidency assigned Narayan Jagannath Vaidya (Deputy Educational Inspector of Sindh) to replace the Abjad script used for Sindhi with the Khudabadi script. The script was decreed a standard script modified with ten vowels by the Bombay Presidency. The Khudabadi script of Sindhi language did not make further progress. Traders continued to maintain their records in this script till the independence of Pakistan in 1947.

The present script predominantly used in Sindh as well as in many states in India and else, where migrants Hindu Sindhi have settled, is Arabic in Naskh styles having 52 letters. However, in some circles in India, Khudabadi and Devanagari is used for writing Sindhi. The Government of India recognizes both scripts.

== Characteristics ==
The word Sindhi written in the Khudabadi script

Khudabadi is an abugida in which all consonants have an inherent vowel. Matras are used to change the inherent vowel. Vowels that appear at the beginning of a word are written as independent letters. When certain consonants occur together, special conjunct symbols are used which combine the essential parts of each letter.

Modern Khudabadi has 37 consonants, 10 vowels, 9 vowel signs written as diacritic marks added to the consonants, 3 miscellaneous signs, one symbol for nasal sounds (anusvara), one symbol for conjuncts (virama) and 10 digits like many other Indic scripts. The nukta has been borrowed from Devanagari for representing additional signs found in Arabic and Persian but not found in Sindhi. It is written from left to right, like Devanagari. It follows the natural pattern and style of other Landa scripts.

Vowels
Independent	𑊰 IPA: ə	𑊱 IPA: a	𑊲 IPA: ɪ	𑊳 IPA: i	𑊴 IPA: ʊ	𑊵 IPA: uː
Dependent		𑋠	𑋡	𑋢	𑋣	𑋤

Independent	𑊶 IPA: e	𑊷 IPA: ɛ	𑊸 IPA: o	𑊹 IPA: ɔ
Dependent	𑋥	𑋦	𑋧	𑋨

Consonants
𑊺 IPA: k	𑊻 IPA: kʰ	𑊼 IPA: ɡ	𑊽 IPA: ɠ	𑊾 IPA: ɡʱ		𑊿 IPA: ŋ
𑋀 IPA: c	𑋁 IPA: cʰ	𑋂 IPA: ɟ	𑋃 IPA: ʄ	𑋄 IPA: ɟʱ		𑋅 IPA: ɲ
𑋆 IPA: ʈ	𑋇 IPA: ʈʰ	𑋈 IPA: ɖ	𑋉 IPA: ɗ	𑋋 IPA: ɖʱ	𑋊 IPA: ɽ	𑋌 IPA: ɳ
𑋍 IPA: t	𑋎 IPA: tʰ	𑋏 IPA: d		𑋐 IPA: dʱ		𑋑 IPA: n
𑋒 IPA: p	𑋓 IPA: pʰ	𑋓𑋩 IPA: f	𑋔 IPA: b	𑋕 IPA: ɓ	𑋖 IPA: bʱ	𑋗 IPA: m
𑋘 IPA: j	𑋙 IPA: r	𑋚 IPA: l	𑋛 IPA: ʋ			
𑋜 IPA: ʂ		𑋝 IPA: s	𑋞 IPA: h			

Other signs
𑋟 anusvara	𑋩 nuqta	𑋪 virama

== Numerals ==
0 𑋰	1 𑋱	2 𑋲	3 𑋳	4 𑋴	5 𑋵	6 𑋶	7 𑋷	8 𑋸	9 𑋹

== Sample text ==
Below is Article 1 of the Universal Declaration of Human rights in the various scripts used to write Sindhi:

=== Khudabadi ===
𑋏𑋓𑋩𑊰 𑋱: 𑋝𑋗𑋤𑋙𑋠 𑊲𑋟𑋝𑋠𑋑 𑊱𑋂𑋩𑋠𑋏 𑊷𑋟 𑊲𑋂𑋩𑋪𑋂𑋩𑋍 𑊷𑋟 𑋞𑊺𑋩𑋑 𑋂𑋢 𑋞𑋛𑋠𑋚𑋥 𑊻𑋠𑋟 𑋔𑋙𑋠𑋔𑋙 𑋒𑋦𑋏𑋠 𑋎𑋡𑋘𑋠 𑊱𑋞𑋡𑋑. 𑊲𑋑𑋪𑋞𑋑 𑊻𑋥 𑊰𑊺𑋩𑋪𑋚 𑊷𑋟 𑋂𑋩𑋗𑋢𑋙 𑋞𑋠𑋝𑋡𑋚 𑋎𑋡𑋘𑋧 𑊱𑋞𑋥, 𑊲𑋑 𑊺𑋙𑋥 𑊲𑋑𑋪𑋞𑋑 𑊻𑋥 𑋞𑋡𑊺 𑋕𑋡𑊶 𑋝𑋠𑋟 𑋖𑋠𑊳𑋀𑋠𑋙𑋥 𑋛𑋠𑋙𑋧 𑋝𑋣𑋚𑋤𑊺 𑊲𑊻𑋩𑋪𑋍𑋡𑋘𑋠𑋙 𑊺𑋙𑋌 𑊾𑋣𑋙𑋂𑋥।

=== Devanagari ===
दफ़अ १: समूरा इंसान आज़ाद ऐं इज़्ज़त ऐं हक़न जी हवाले खां बराबर पैदा थिया आहिन। इन्हन खे अक़्ल ऐं ज़मीर हासिल थियो आहे, इन करे इन्हन खे हिक ॿिए सां भाईचारे वारो सुलूक इख़्तियार करण घुरजे॥

=== Romanisation ===
Dafa 1. Samūrā insān āzād aĩ 'izzat aĩ haqan jī havālē khā̃ barābar paidā thiyā āhin. Inhan khē aqul aĩ zamīr hāsil thiyō āhē, in karē inhan khē hik ɓiē sā̃ bhāīchārē vārō sulūk ikhtiyār karaṇ ghurjē.

=== IPA Transliteration ===
d̪əfə eːk. səmuːɾaː ɪnsaːn aːzaːd̪ ɛ̃ ɪzːət̪ ɛ̃ həqən d͡ʒiː həʋaːleː kʰãː bəɾaːbəɾ pɛːd̪aː tʰɪjaː aːhɪn. ɪnʱən kʰeː əqʊl ɛ̃ zəmiːɾ haːsɪl tʰɪjoː aːheː, ɪn kəɾeː ɪnʱən kʰeː hɪk ɓɪ.eː sãː bʱaːiːt͡ʃaːɾeː ʋaːɾoː sʊluːk ɪxt̪ɪjaːɾ kəɾəɳ gʱʊɾd͡ʒeː

=== Translation ===
Article 1: All human beings are born free and equal in dignity and rights. They are endowed with reason and conscience and should act towards one another in a spirit of brotherhood.

== Unicode ==
Khudabadi script was added to the Unicode Standard in June 2014 with the release of version 7.0.

Khudabadi is being used as the unified encoding for all of the Sindhi scripts except for Khojki, because each Sindhi script is named after the mercantile village in which it was used, and a vast majority are not well-developed enough to be encoded. Local scripts may be encoded in the future, but at the present, Khudabadi is recommended to represent all of the Landa-based Sindhi scripts that have been in use.

The Unicode block for Khudabadi, called Khudawadi, is U+112B0–U+112FF:

Khudawadi^{[1]}^{[2]} Official Unicode Consortium code chart (PDF)
	0	1	2	3	4	5	6	7	8	9	A	B	C	D	E	F
U+112Bx	𑊰	𑊱	𑊲	𑊳	𑊴	𑊵	𑊶	𑊷	𑊸	𑊹	𑊺	𑊻	𑊼	𑊽	𑊾	𑊿
U+112Cx	𑋀	𑋁	𑋂	𑋃	𑋄	𑋅	𑋆	𑋇	𑋈	𑋉	𑋊	𑋋	𑋌	𑋍	𑋎	𑋏
U+112Dx	𑋐	𑋑	𑋒	𑋓	𑋔	𑋕	𑋖	𑋗	𑋘	𑋙	𑋚	𑋛	𑋜	𑋝	𑋞	𑋟
U+112Ex	𑋠	𑋡	𑋢	𑋣	𑋤	𑋥	𑋦	𑋧	𑋨	𑋩	𑋪					
U+112Fx	𑋰	𑋱	𑋲	𑋳	𑋴	𑋵	𑋶	𑋷	𑋸	𑋹						
Notes 1.As of Unicode version 18.0 2.Grey areas indicate non-assigned code points

== See also ==
- Sindhi language
- Khudabad
- Gurmukhi
- Bhaiband
