= Tombs of the Talpur Mirs =

- میران تالپور کے مقبرے (Urdu)
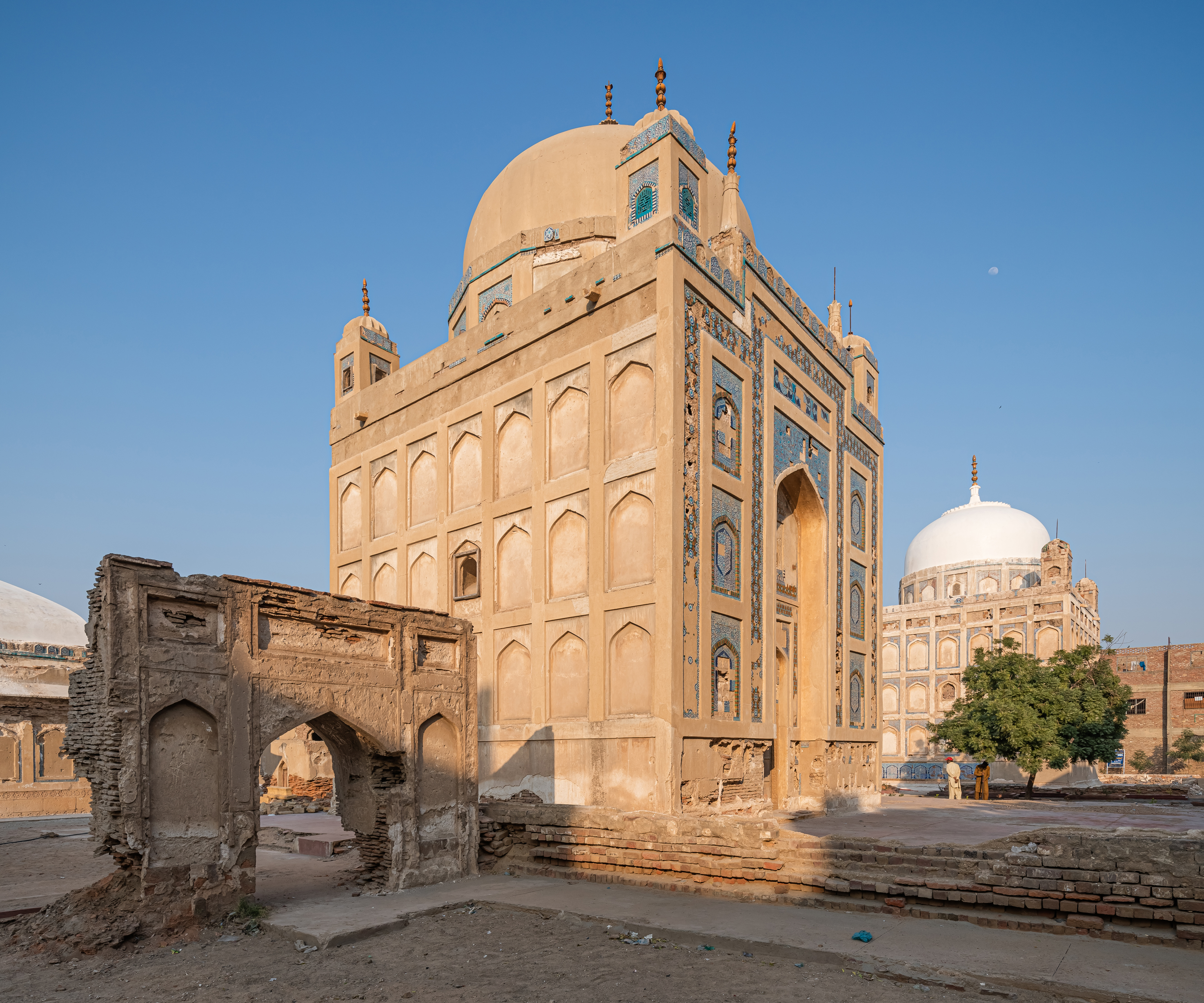
- The tomb complex in February 2020
- Interactive map of Tombs of the Talpur Mirs
- 25°24′17.658″N 68°21′56.5452″E
- Location: Hirabad, Hyderabad, Sindh, Pakistan

Site notes
- Management: Culture Department, Government of Sindh; Department of Archaeology, Government of Pakistan (formerly)
- Public access: Yes

The Tombs of Talpur Mirs (Urdu: میران تالپور کے مقبرے) are a complex of tombs of the Talpur Mirs of Sindh who reigned from 1784 to 1843. The tombs are also known as Cubbas (the Sindhi word for Domes). These tombs are located in Hirabad, Hyderabad in the Sindh province of Pakistan.

The tombs complex hosts large mausoleums for former Talpur rulers while there are several smaller mausoleums for their wives, consorts and infant children. There are several graves in the external area that are uncovered and unmarked, apart from a few exceptions. The graves are mostly made out of marble and usually have Quranic verses inscribed on their surfaces.

Once a magnificent burial ground for the Talpur rulers, this place now has several preservation concerns. As of 30 March 2011, the Culture Department, Government of Sindh retained the charge for these monuments, following a devolution of the government to provinces. Since then, there has been slow and steady restoration work on preserving these monuments.

== Architecture ==
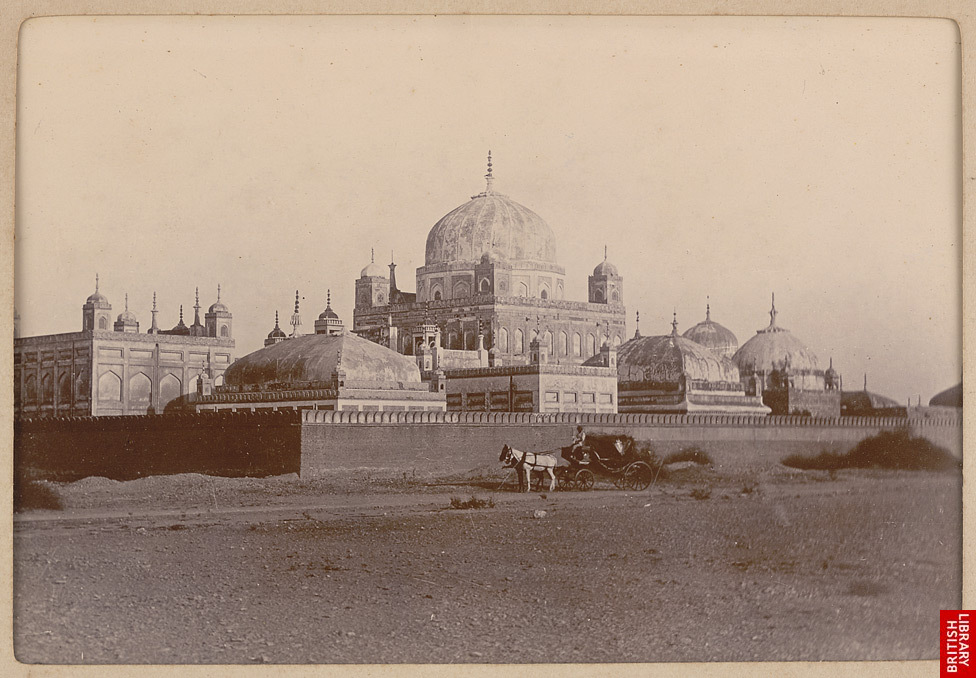
Photograph of the tombs complex (c. 1900)

The architecture patterns of the tombs in the complex are reminiscent of various Talpur structures, however most of the tombs in this complex are either square or rectangular in shape. These structures follow almost the same specifications as that of the mausoleum of Mir Fateh Ali Khan at New Khudabad.

The largest domed structure contains two graves, those of, Mir Karam Ali Khan (d. 1828) and Mir Murad Ali Khan (d. 1833). Behind this building is a smaller building which contains the graves of Mir Karam’s two wives, the wife of Mir Abdullah Khan and an infant. To the north of these structures is one containing the graves of Talpur rulers, Mir Nur Muhammad Khan, Mir Nasir Khan, Mir Shahdad Khan and Mir Hussain Ali Khan. It is said that the rulers designed their own burial places while alive.

The building in front of the last on the east, contains the remains of the wife and child of Mir Nur Muhammad Khan and the wife of Mir Husayn Ali Khan. Other wives of two of these rulers and three young children, repose in the small tomb in the north-west corner. Other Mirs lie within the two small tombs at the southwest corner of Mir Karam Ali Khan’s mausoleum and the remaining buildings contain the bodies of wives, daughters and children of some of these.

In the southern group of tombs, two principal mausoleums that are nearest the entrance on the east and immediately behind it, contain the graves of four Mirs, while the rest are occupied by their wives and children.

=== Vaulted structures ===
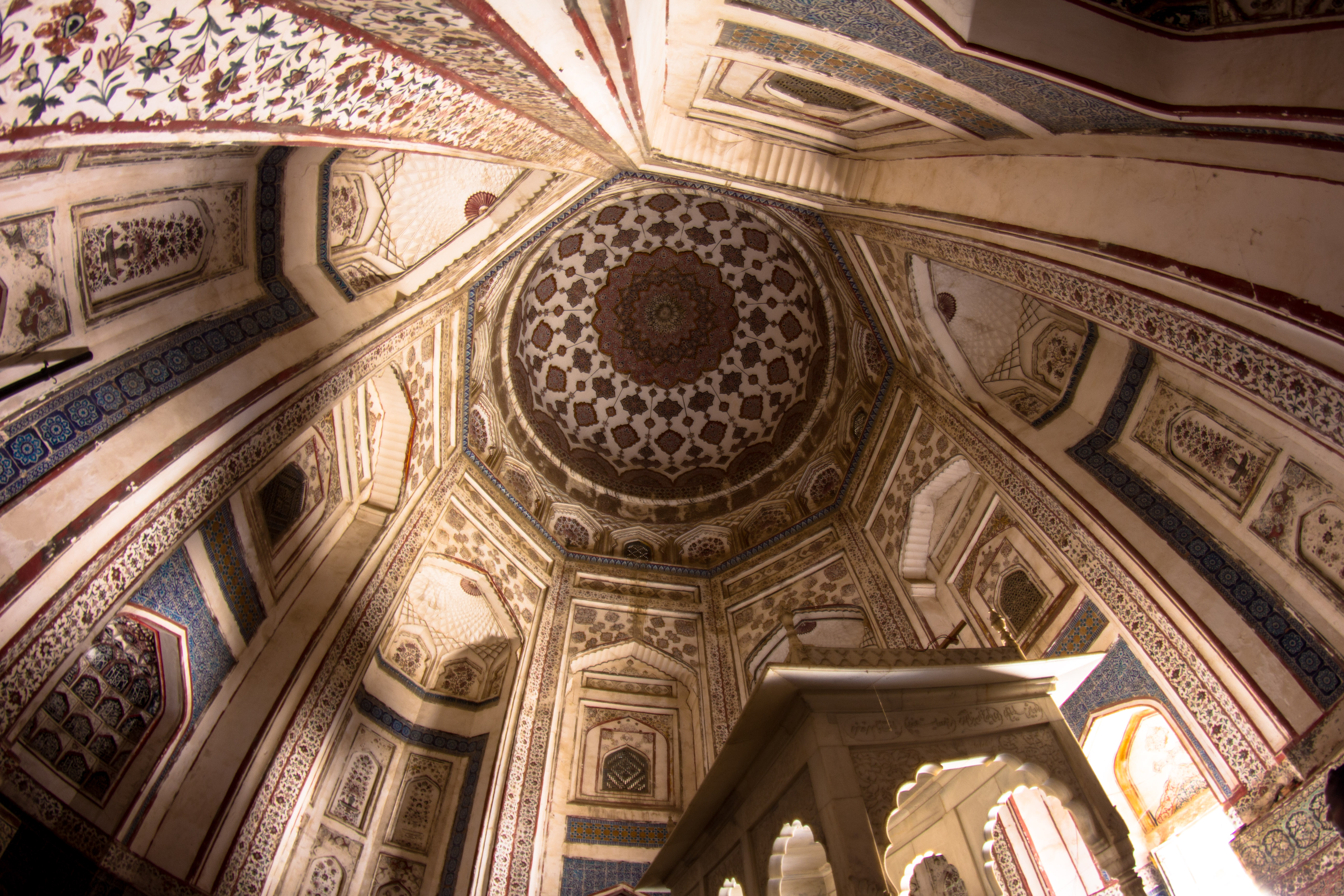
Interior of one of the tombs

The ladies’ mausoleums are peculiar in the sense that they appear to look like vaulted wagon structures. One such mausoleum is rectangular in plan and surmounted by two domes, flanked by kicks on each of its four corners. The façade containing the entrance door is divided into three arched panels on each side. On the top of each arched panel, there is a rectangular panel covered with tiles in floral patterns. The other sides of the mausoleum contain more or less the same arched panelling and similar decorative colour scheme.

=== Decorative art ===
These tombs are renowned for the tile decoration on their outside façade. The tiles are placed in multiple colours which primarily include blue floral patterns over white background. Some accents of green, yellow and brown are placed in a manner so as to break the monotonous decorative look.

== Burial traditions ==
In typical Talpur fashion, the marble graves have the actual royal turbans of these rulers placed upon a projection at the end of each. The graves are etched with Quranic verses in Arabic, whilst some of the walls inside the mausoleums are decorated with poetry in Persian. Apart from the Arabic inscriptions on the graves, they are largely unmarked and have no names to denote their occupants. The graves are usually covered in marble masonry work.

Unmarked graves on the outside
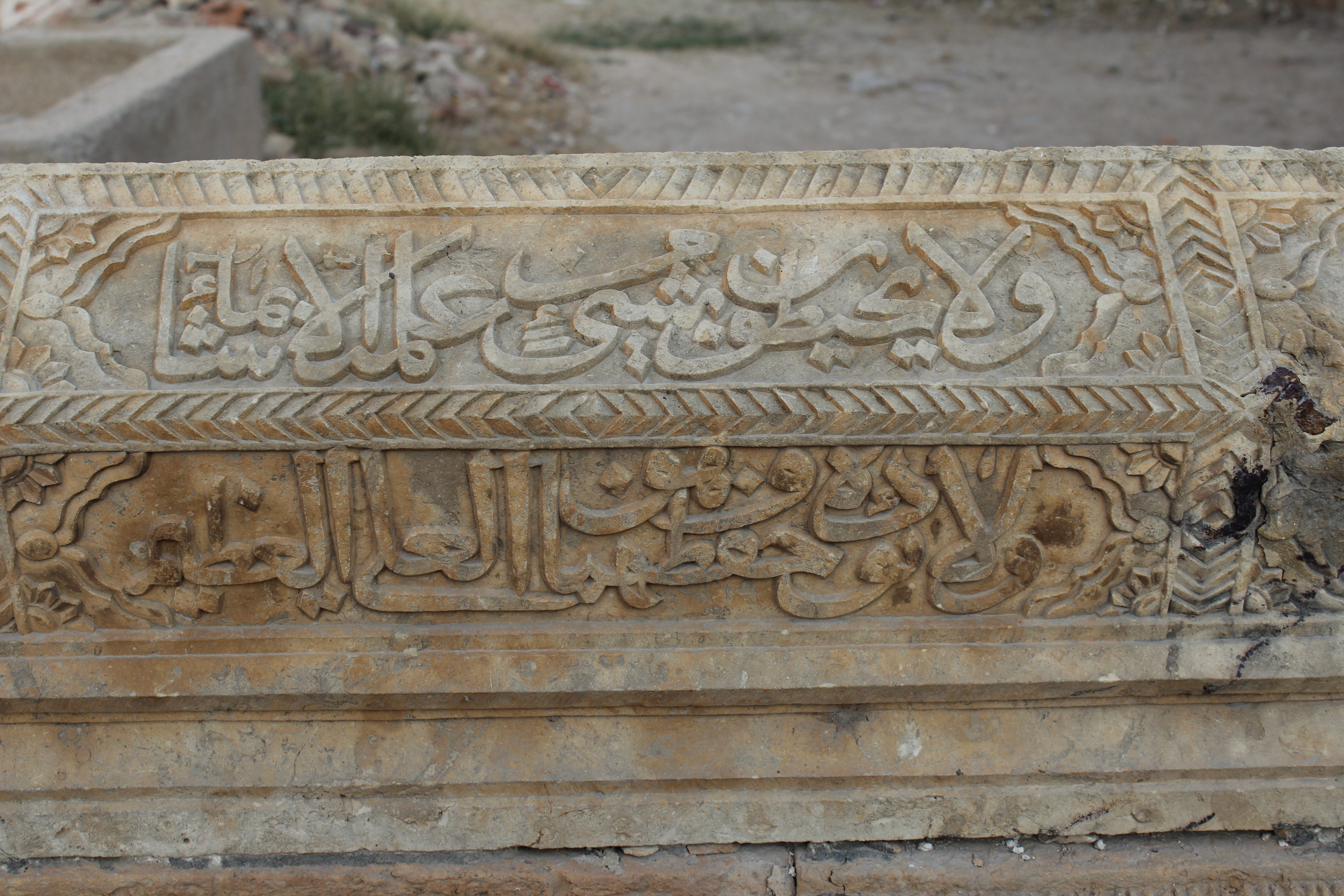
One motif clearly visible on the Mirs’ graves are the engraved Quranic verses

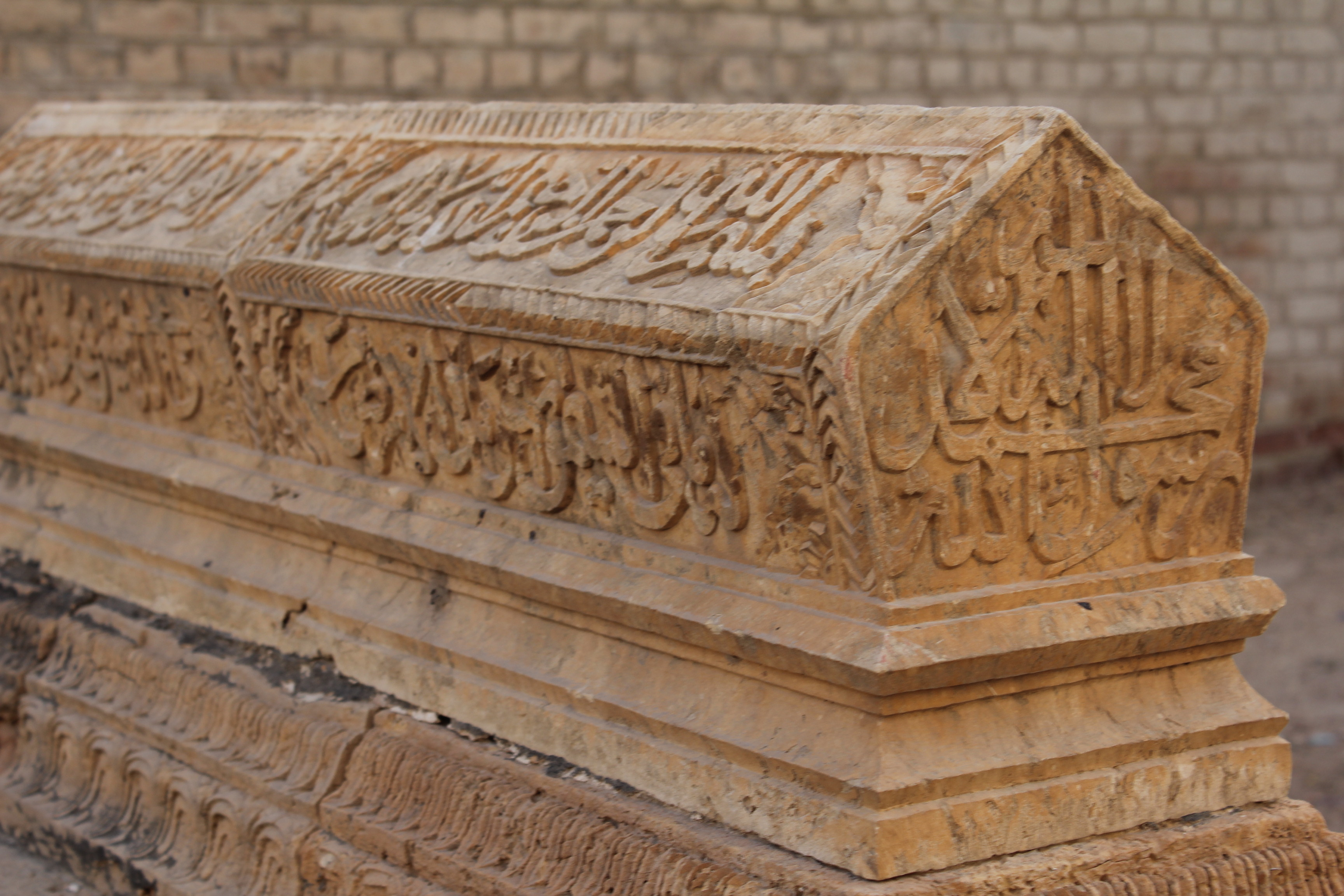
The graves are decorated in calligraphic Arabic verses, engraved on marble stone

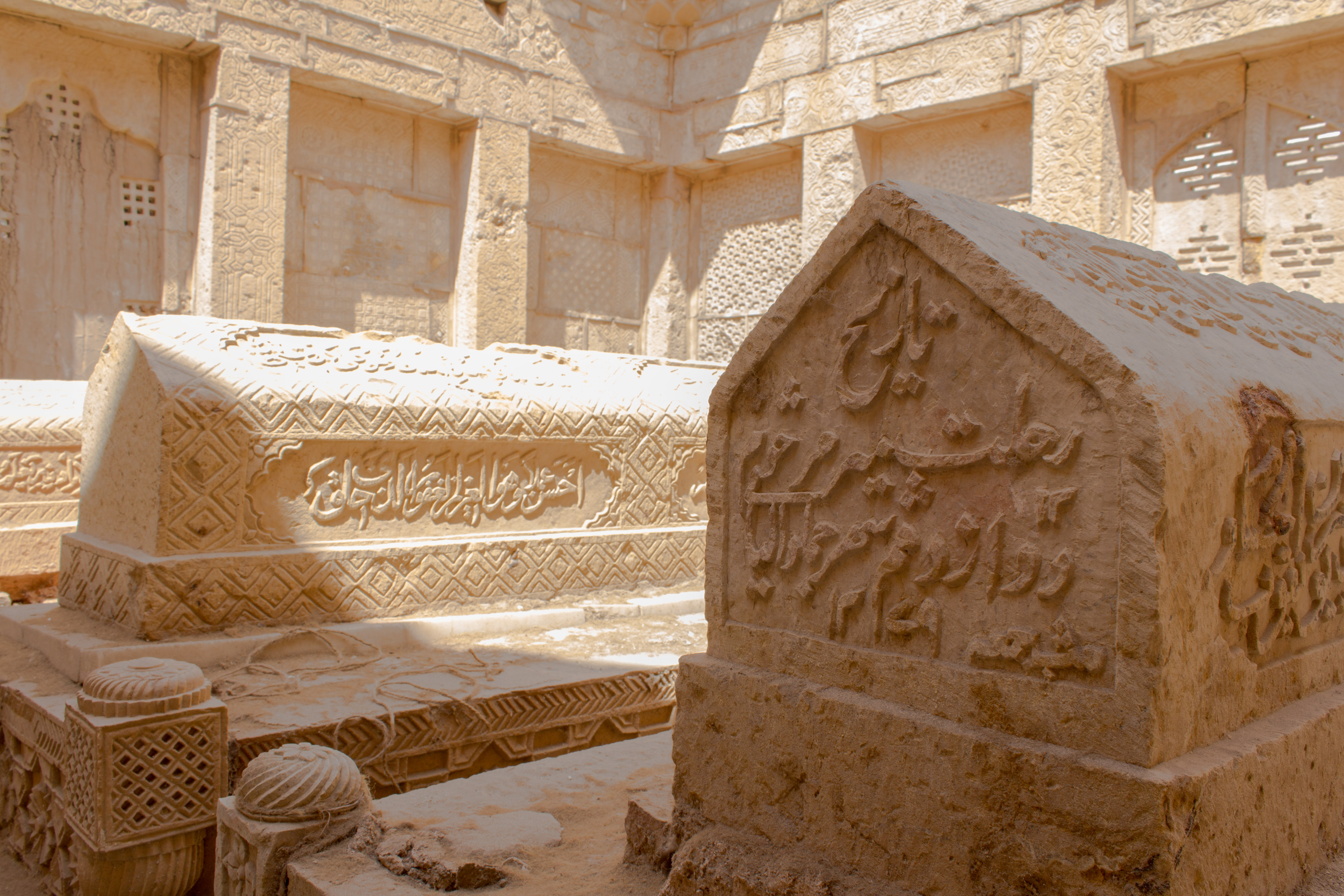
While these graves are usually unmarked, there are a few exceptions

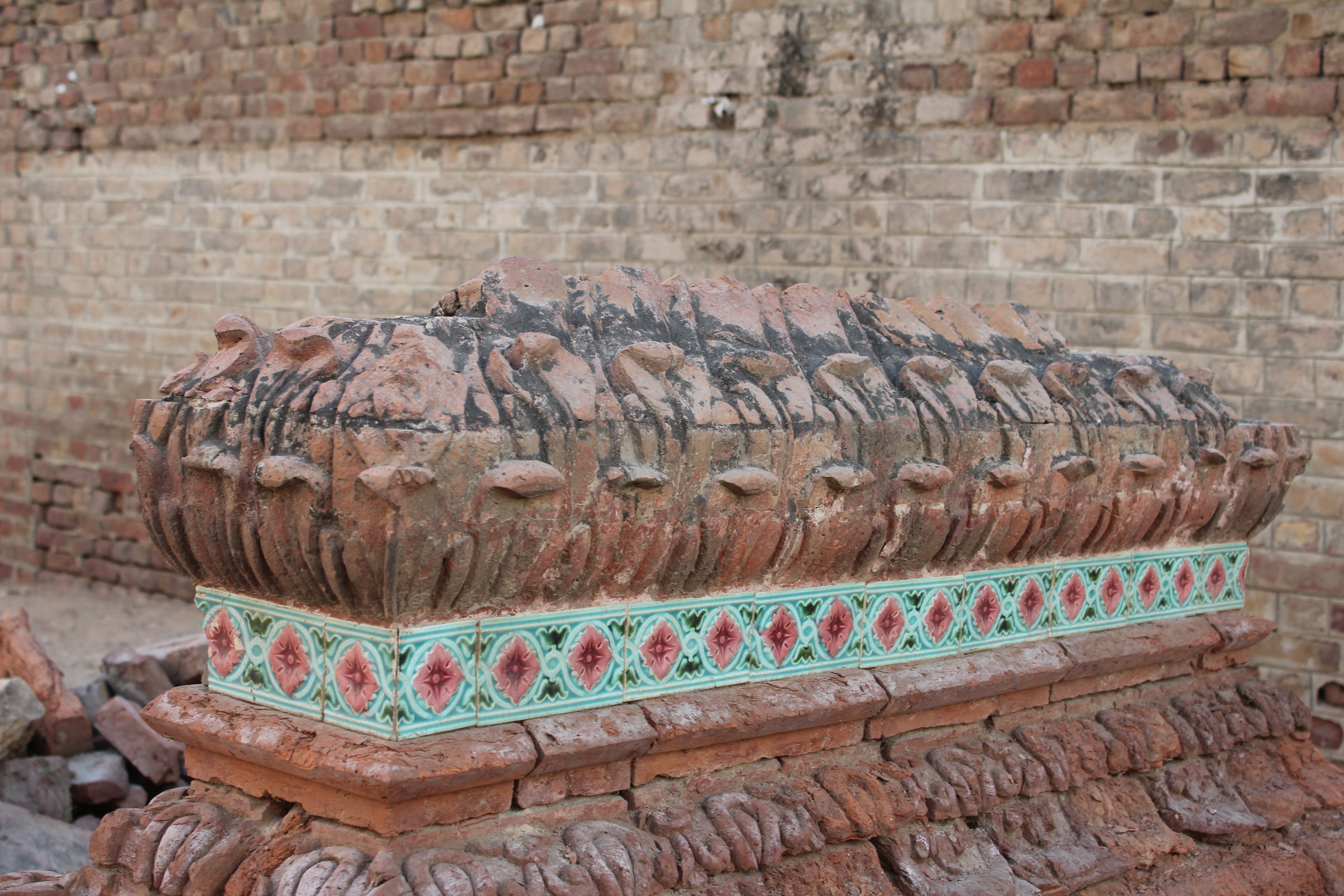
Some graves are more flamboyant than others in their masonry work

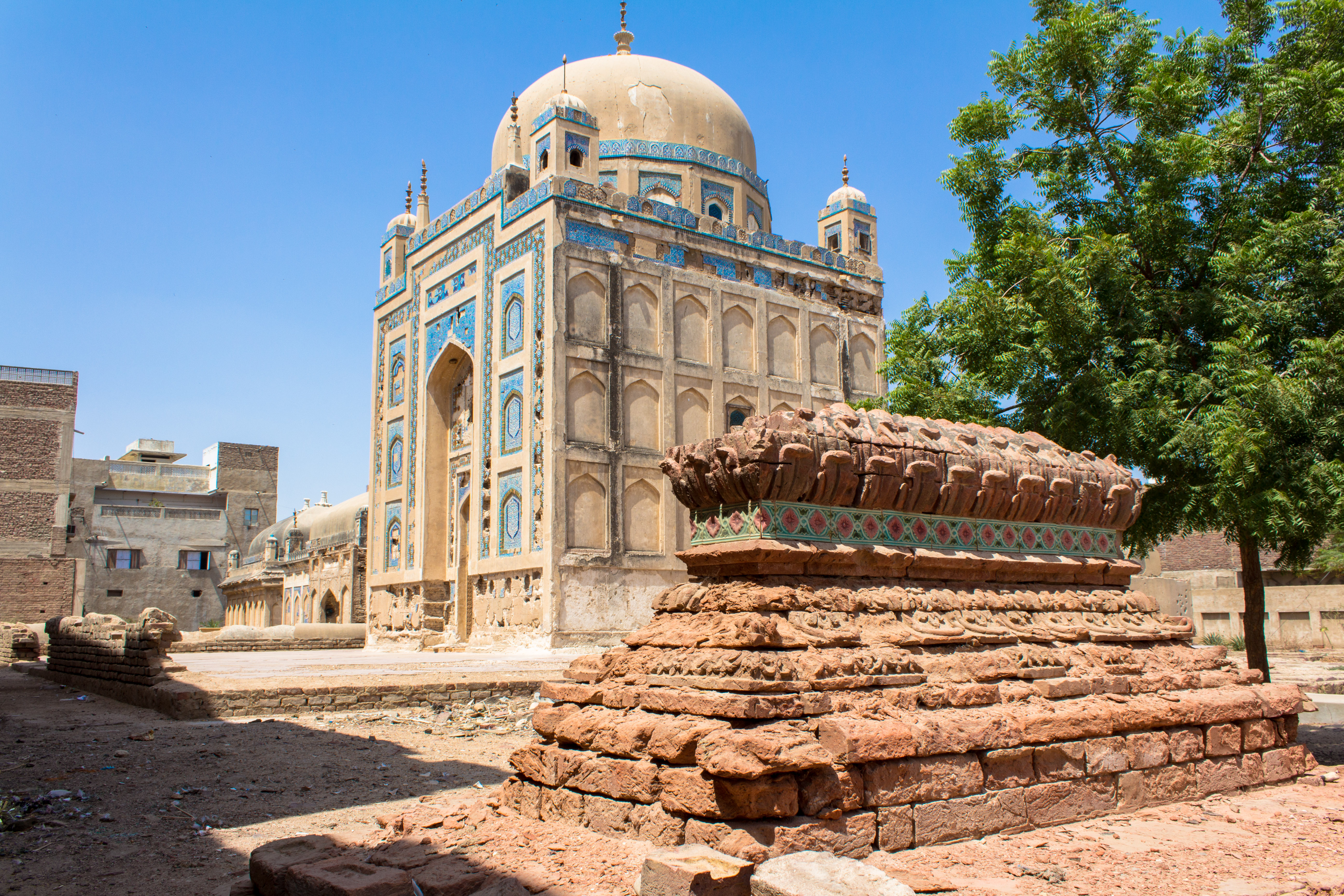
An unmarked grave outside a mausoleum

=== Purdah for females ===
The mausoleums of female Talpurs are designed to be closed structures. These are distinctly vaulted structures with jaalis on the door archways to show the dead buried within still observing purdah, as they would’ve in life. To this day, it is forbidden for men to step inside these mausoleums.

== Preservation ==
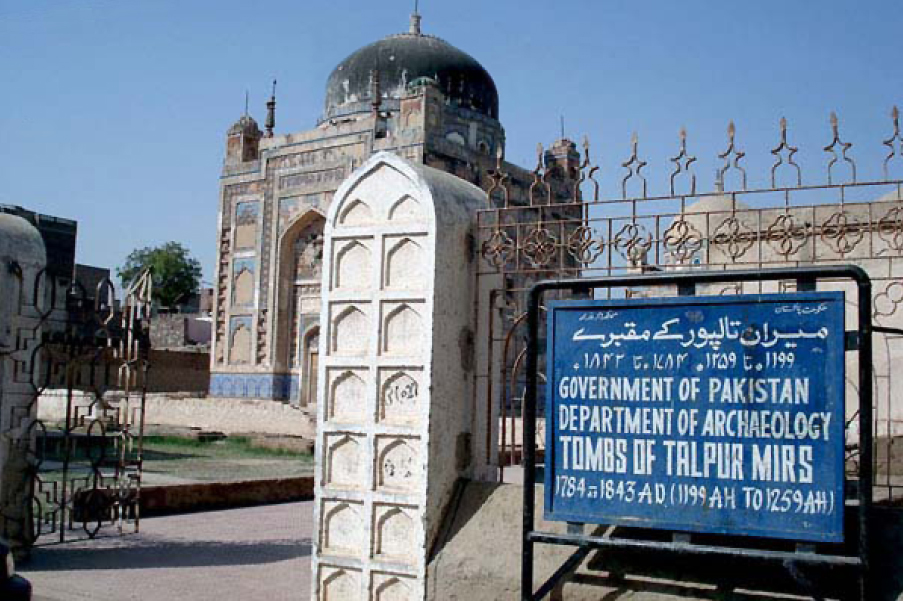
The visitor is greeted by a board erected by the Department of Archaeology, Government of Pakistan which has since been appropriately modified after the government was devolved to the province.

Once a magnificent burial ground for the Talpur rulers, this place now has several preservation concerns. Under the management of the Department of Archaeology, Government of Pakistan, the mausoleums fell into disrepair. As of 30 March 2011, the Culture Department, Government of Sindh retained the charge for these monuments, following a devolution of the government to provinces.

The tomb complex is now enclosed in a walled area in order to put a halt to the encroaching residential buildings surrounding the site. Many of the crumbling tombs were “used by drug addicts and drifters for resting the night” whilst “local youngsters to play cricket during the day” in wide open spaces around the mausoleums.

=== Restoration and maintenance ===
Lately, there have been efforts to restore the tombs of ancient rulers elsewhere, including some of former Talpur rulers. The restoration began in April 2012 and was led by Ishtiaq Ansari. Where there are restoration works actively in progress elsewhere, the site, that is the subject of this article, has since been neglected.

The newly devolved Sindh government nevertheless shows a willingness to work towards improving these monuments and “mak[ing] right [the wrongs of] the past 63 years” under the former management.

== Gallery ==
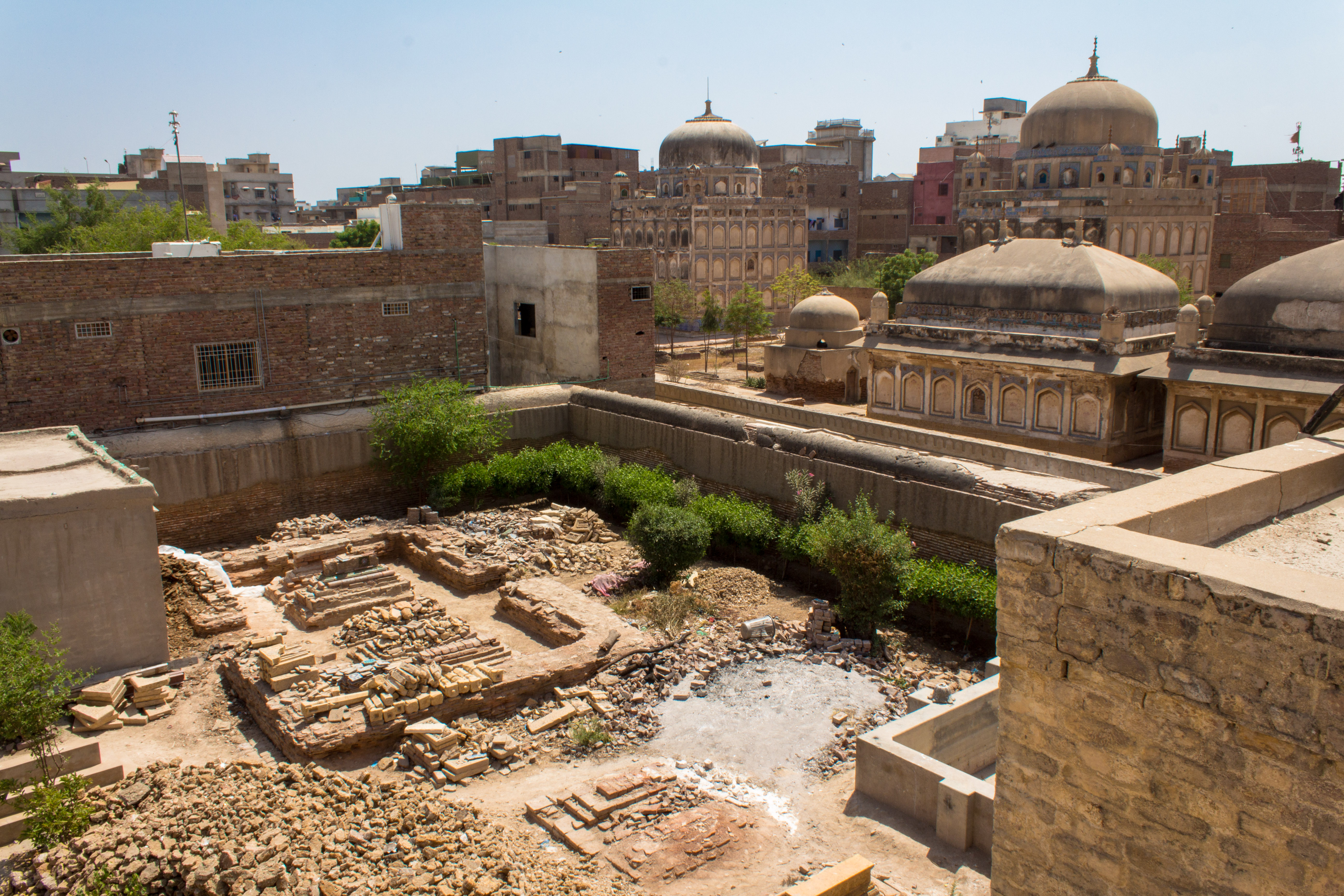
View of the tomb complex from adjacent buildings

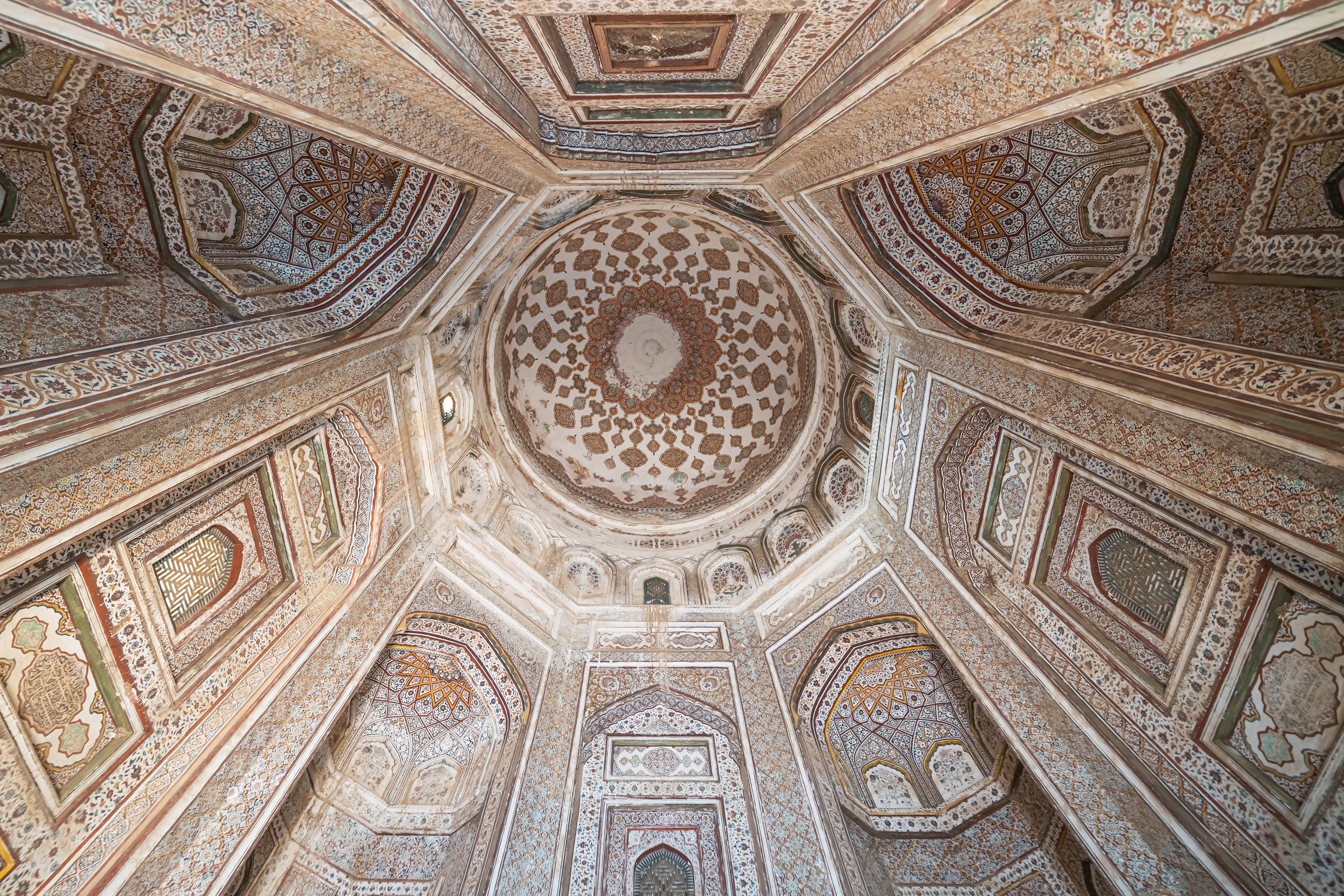
Dome interior of one of the tombs

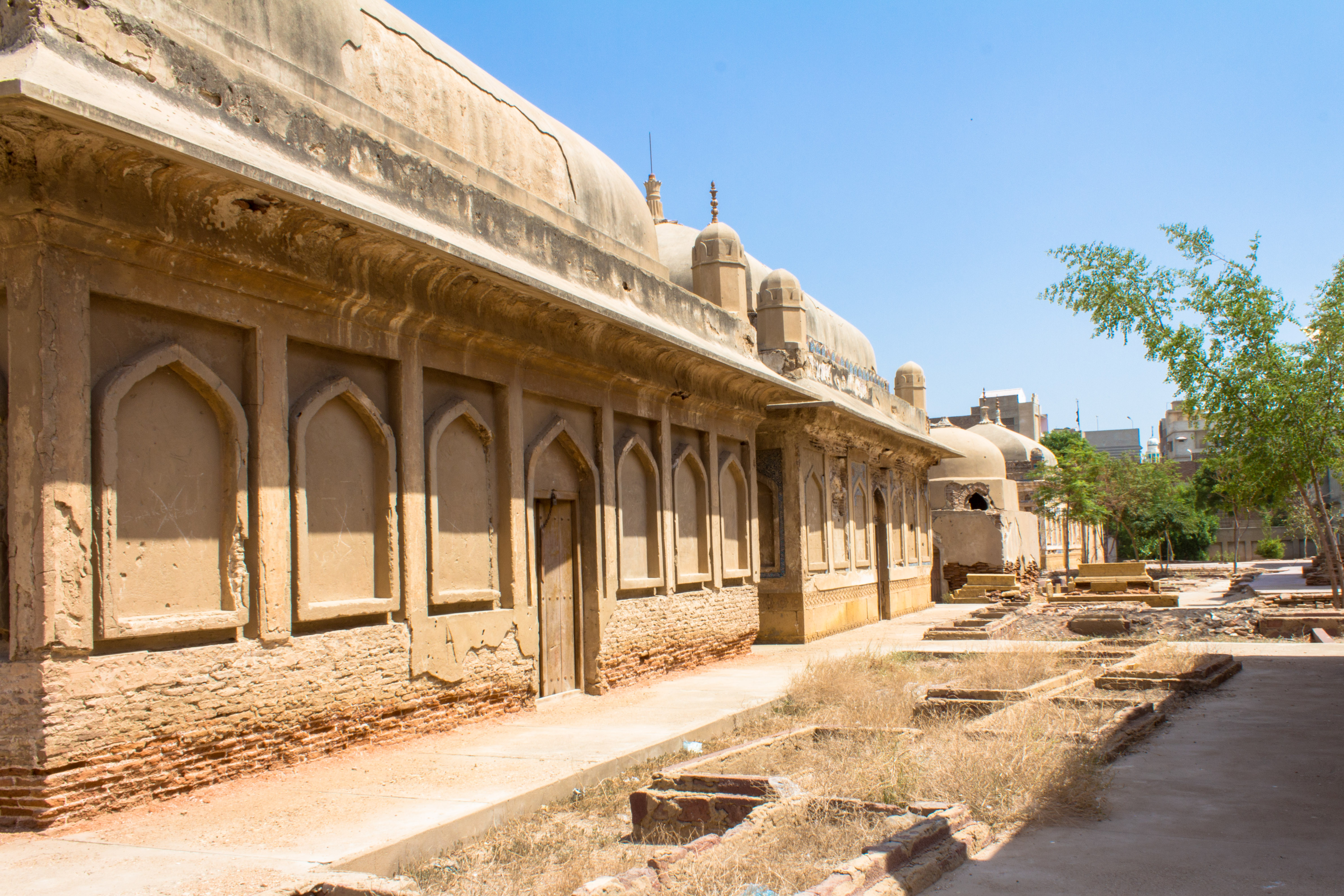
Mausoleums of female Talpurs (eastward view) are denoted by two domes joined into one

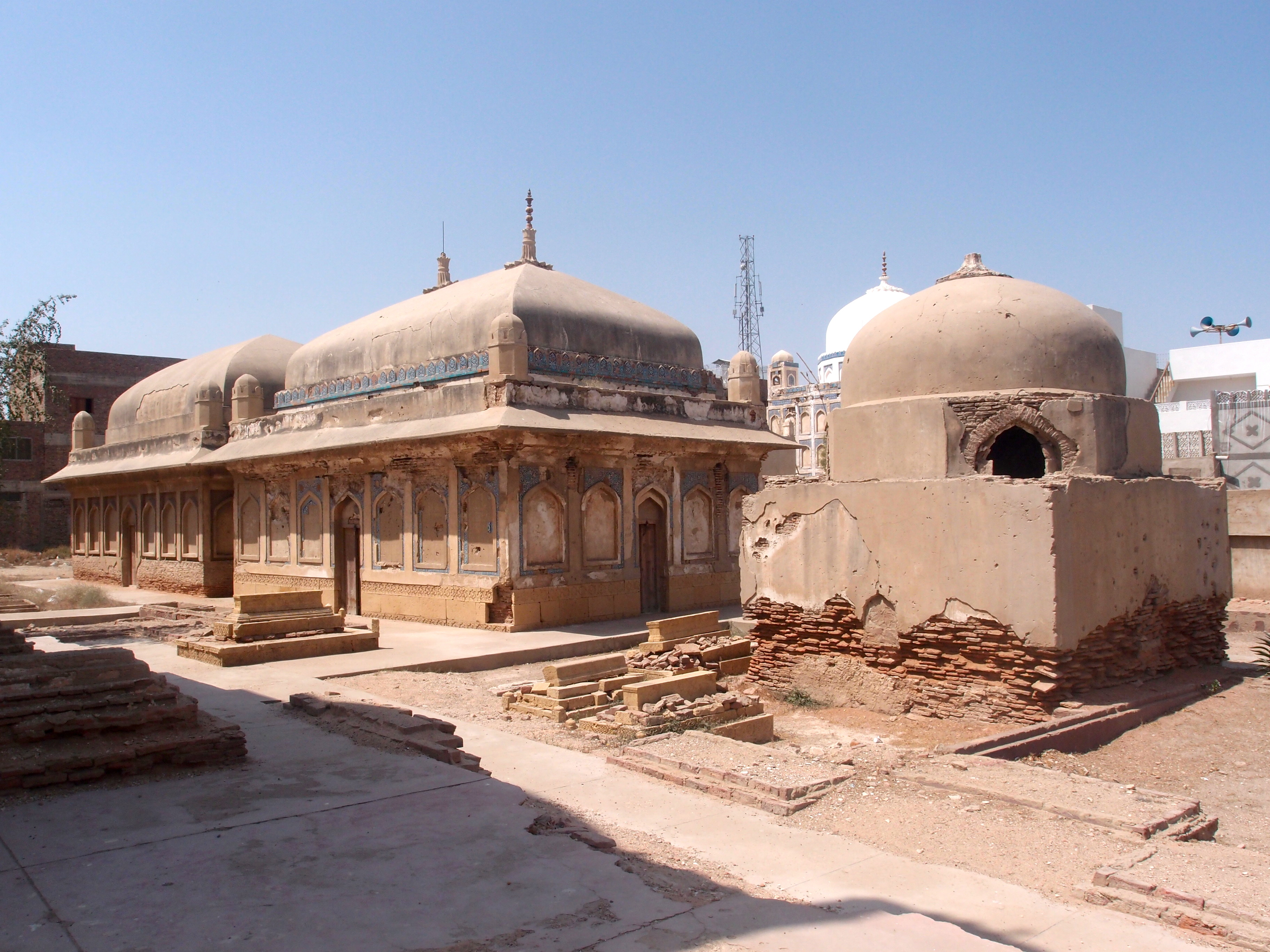
Mausoleums of female Talpurs (westward view)

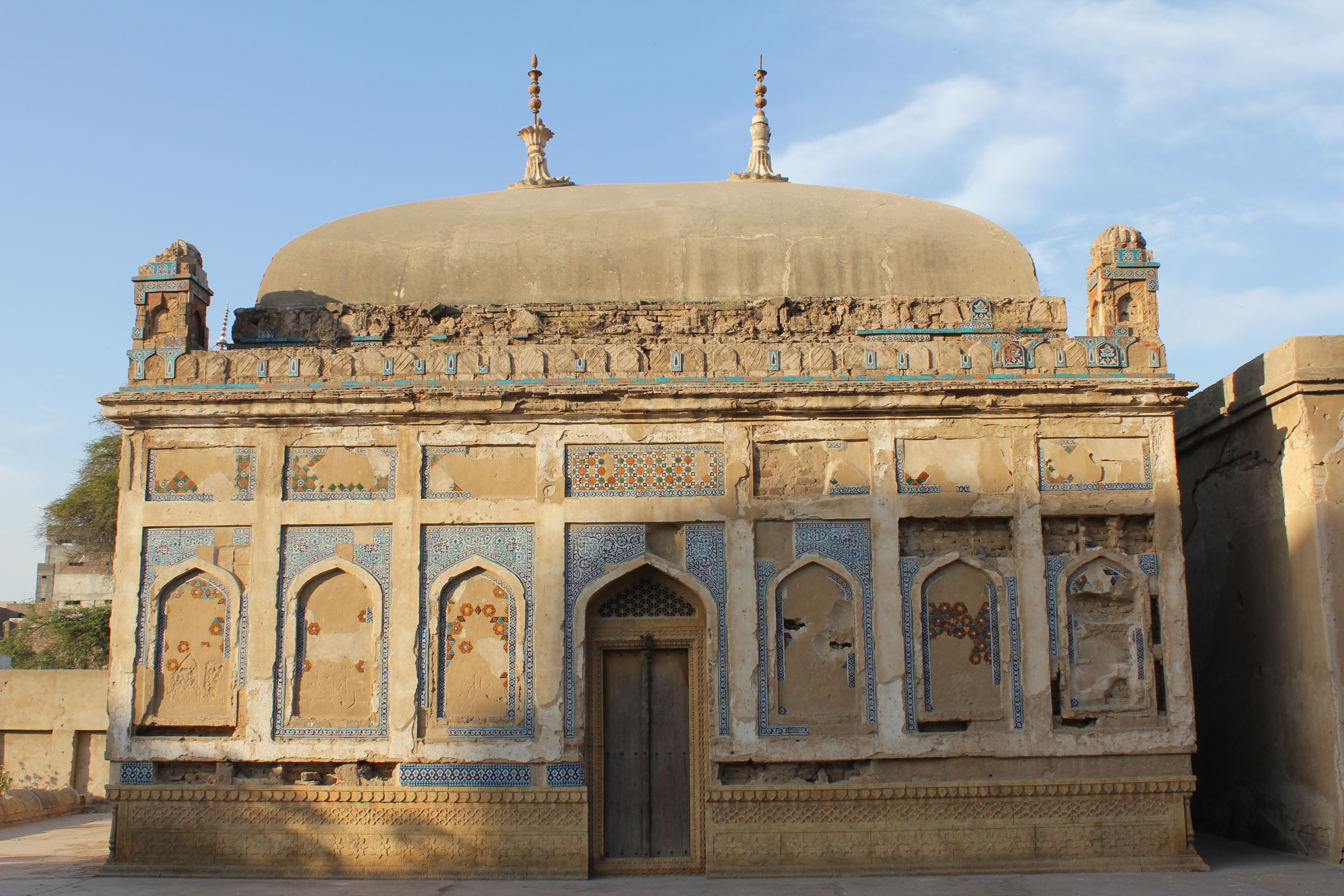
Mausoleum containing graves of two females and an infant

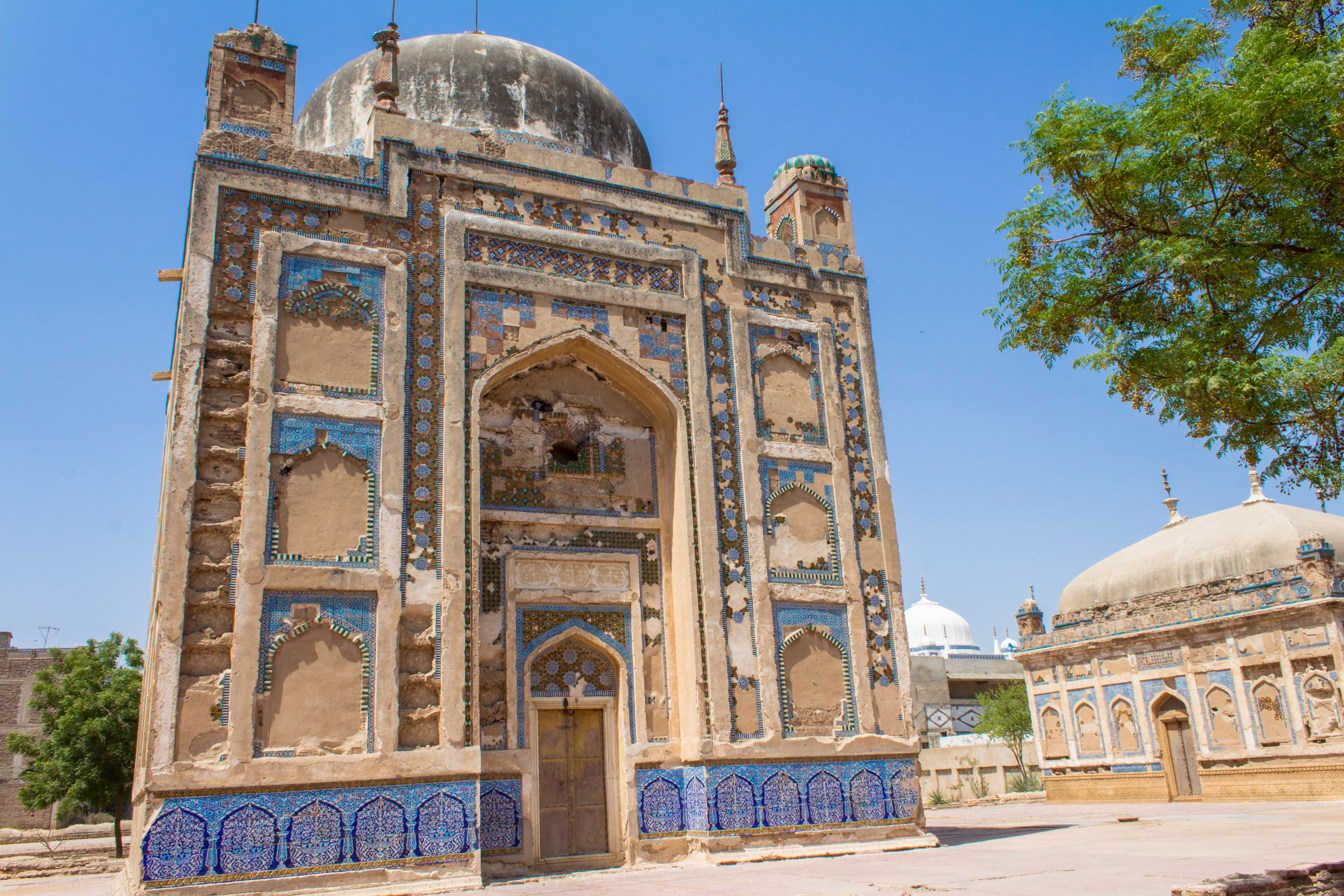
The largest structure in the tomb complex contains the grave of Mir Karam Ali Khan

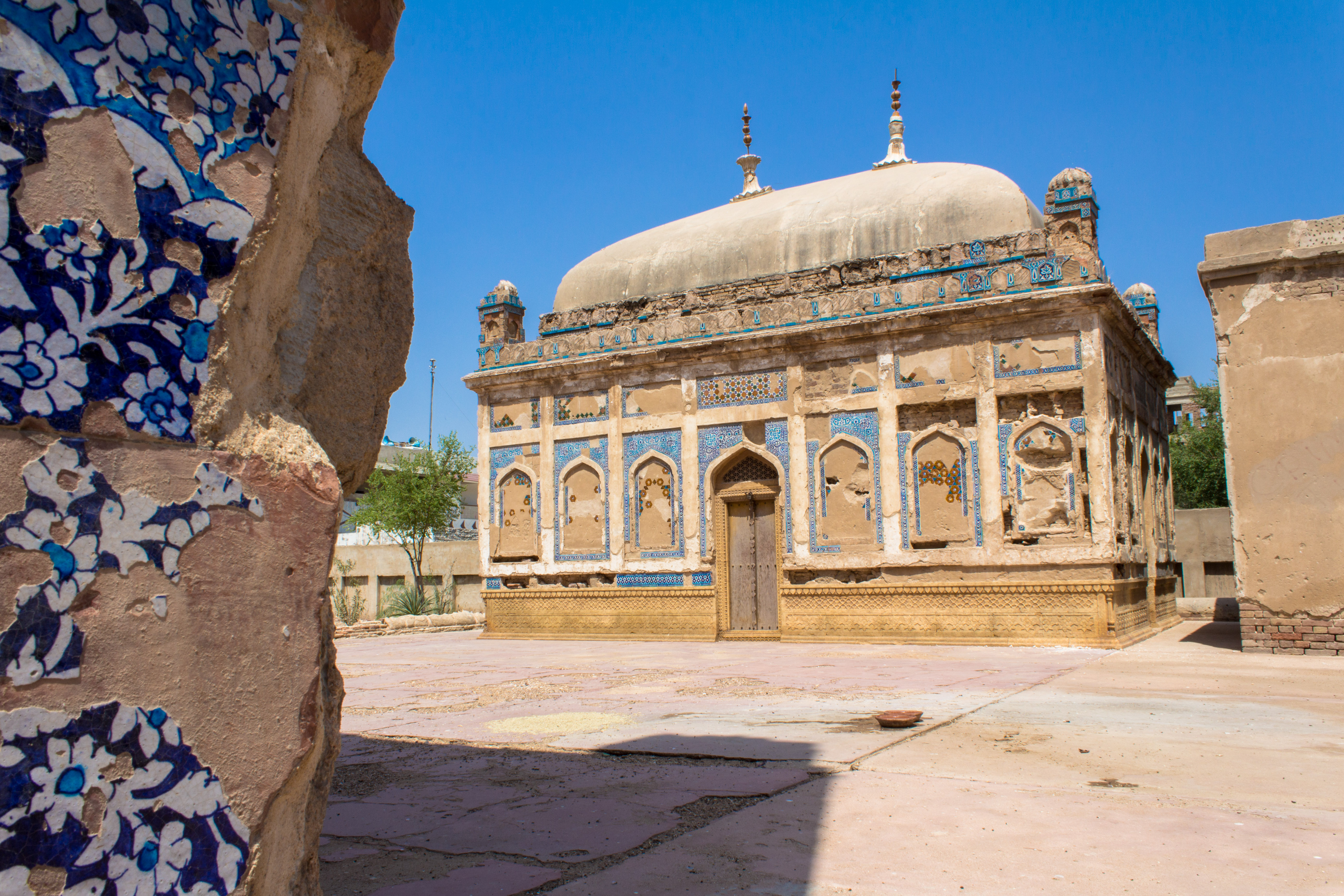
Mausoleum of female Talpurs designated by conjoined twin domes and a jaali on the arched doorway

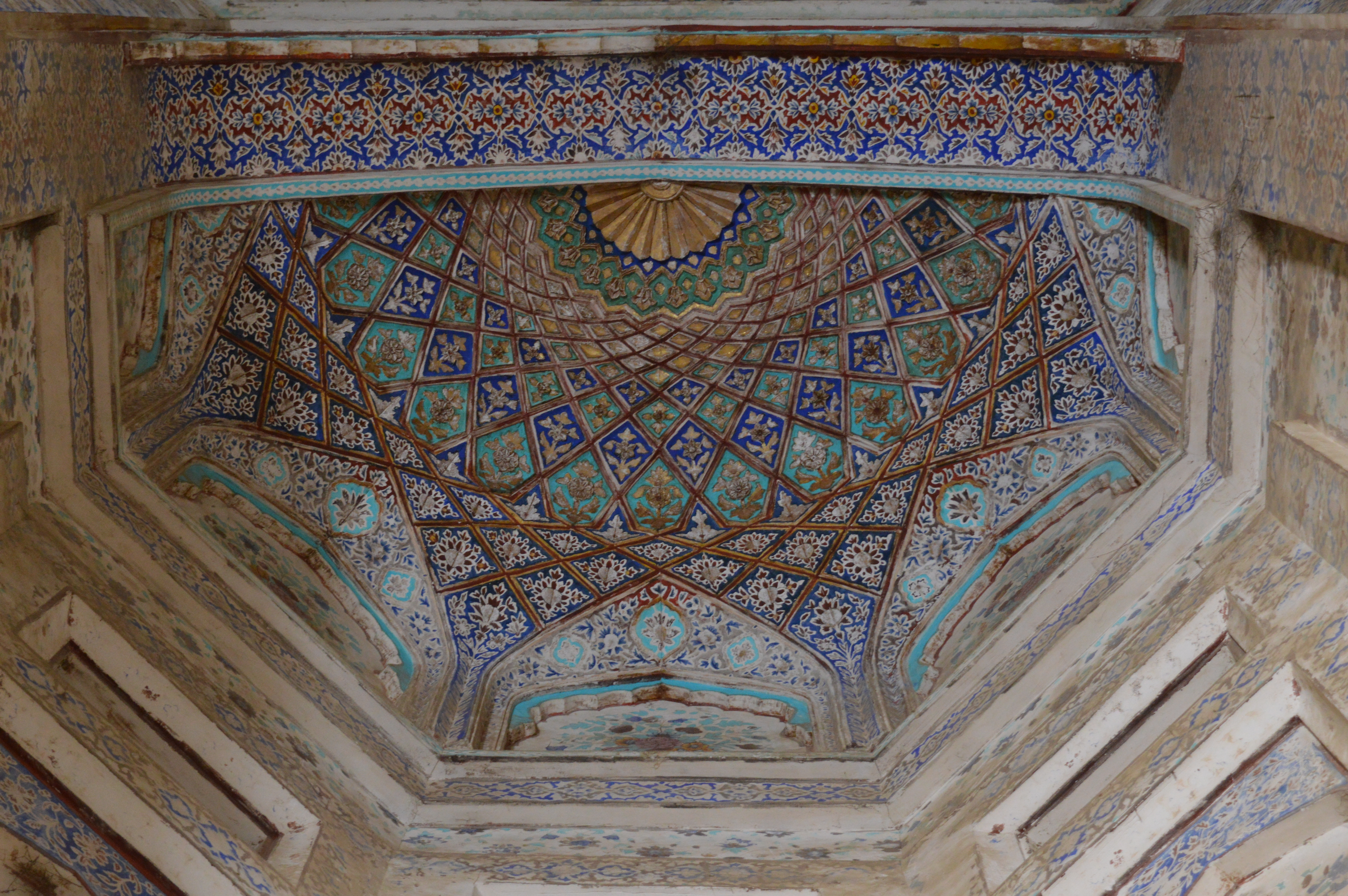
Ceiling of the tomb of Mir Mohammad Khan Talpur

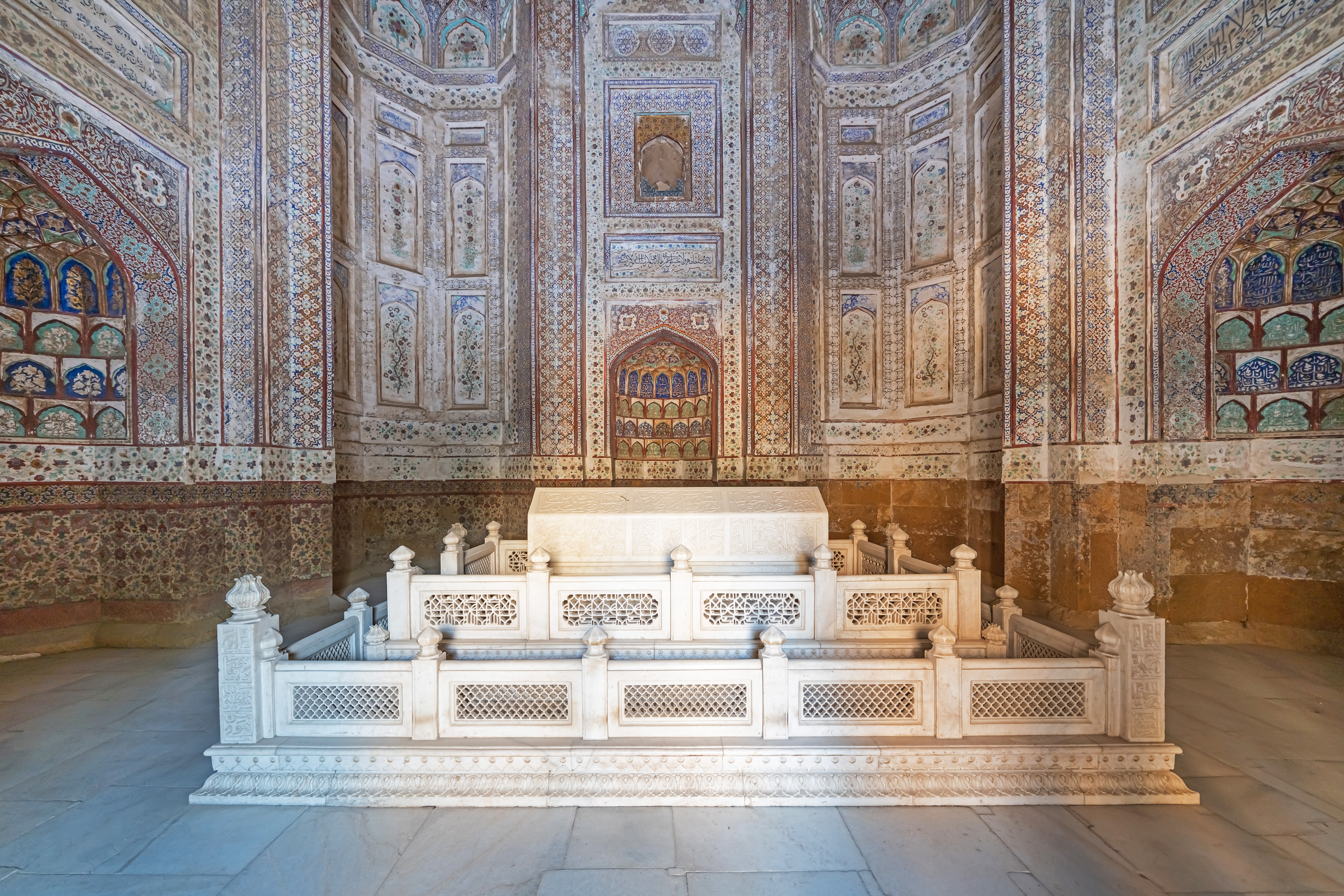
Interior of the Tomb of Mir Mohammad Khan Talpur
