= Khudawadi (Unicode block) =

- Range: U+112B0..U+112FF (80 code points)
- Plane: SMP
- Scripts: Khudawadi
- Major alphabets: Khudabadi
- Assigned: 69 code points
- Unused: 11 reserved code points

Unicode version history
- 7.0 (2014): 69 (+69)

Unicode documentation
- Code chart ∣ Web page

Khudawadi is a Unicode block containing characters of the Khudabadi script used by some Sindhis in India for writing the Sindhi language.

== Block ==
Khudawadi^{[1]}^{[2]} Official Unicode Consortium code chart (PDF)
| | 0 | 1 | 2 | 3 | 4 | 5 | 6 | 7 | 8 | 9 | A | B | C | D | E | F |
| U+112Bx | 𑊰 | 𑊱 | 𑊲 | 𑊳 | 𑊴 | 𑊵 | 𑊶 | 𑊷 | 𑊸 | 𑊹 | 𑊺 | 𑊻 | 𑊼 | 𑊽 | 𑊾 | 𑊿 |
| U+112Cx | 𑋀 | 𑋁 | 𑋂 | 𑋃 | 𑋄 | 𑋅 | 𑋆 | 𑋇 | 𑋈 | 𑋉 | 𑋊 | 𑋋 | 𑋌 | 𑋍 | 𑋎 | 𑋏 |
| U+112Dx | 𑋐 | 𑋑 | 𑋒 | 𑋓 | 𑋔 | 𑋕 | 𑋖 | 𑋗 | 𑋘 | 𑋙 | 𑋚 | 𑋛 | 𑋜 | 𑋝 | 𑋞 | 𑋟 |
| U+112Ex | 𑋠 | 𑋡 | 𑋢 | 𑋣 | 𑋤 | 𑋥 | 𑋦 | 𑋧 | 𑋨 | 𑋩 | 𑋪 | | | | | |
| U+112Fx | 𑋰 | 𑋱 | 𑋲 | 𑋳 | 𑋴 | 𑋵 | 𑋶 | 𑋷 | 𑋸 | 𑋹 | | | | | | |
Notes: 1. As of Unicode version 16.0; 2. Grey areas indicate non-assigned code points

== History ==
The following Unicode-related documents record the purpose and process of defining specific characters in the Khudawadi block:

| Version | Final code points (Note: Proposed code points and characters names may differ from final code points and names) | Count | L2 ID | WG2 ID | Document |
|---|---|---|---|---|---|
| 7.0 | U+112B0..112EA, 112F0..112F9 | 69 | L2/10-011R | N3766 | Pandey, Anshuman (2010-02-09), A Roadmap for Scripts of the Landa Family |
| 7.0 | U+112B0..112EA, 112F0..112F9 | 69 | L2/10-012R | N3767 | Pandey, Anshuman (2010-02-09), Preliminary Proposal to Encode the Sindhi Script in ISO/IEC 10646 |
| 7.0 | U+112B0..112EA, 112F0..112F9 | 69 | L2/10-013 | N3768 | Pandey, Anshuman (2010-02-09), Preliminary Proposal to Encode the Landa Script in ISO/IEC 10646 |
| 7.0 | U+112B0..112EA, 112F0..112F9 | 69 | L2/10-299R | | Anderson, Deborah; McGowan, Rick; Whistler, Ken (2010-08-06), "Sindhi script proposal", Review of Indic-related L2 documents and Recommendations to the UTC |
| 7.0 | U+112B0..112EA, 112F0..112F9 | 69 | L2/10-221 | | Moore, Lisa (2010-08-23), "D.7", UTC #124 / L2 #221 Minutes |
| 7.0 | U+112B0..112EA, 112F0..112F9 | 69 | L2/10-271R | N3871R | Pandey, Anshuman (2010-09-10), Proposal to Encode the Sindhi Script in ISO/IEC 10646 |
| 7.0 | U+112B0..112EA, 112F0..112F9 | 69 | L2/10-420 | N3957 | Pandey, Anshuman (2010-10-25), Request to Rename 'Sindhi' to 'Khudawadi' |
| 7.0 | U+112B0..112EA, 112F0..112F9 | 69 | L2/10-440 | | Anderson, Deborah; McGowan, Rick; Whistler, Ken (2010-10-27), "8. Script Name Change for Sindhi", Review of Indic-related L2 documents and Recommendations to the UTC |
| 7.0 | U+112B0..112EA, 112F0..112F9 | 69 | L2/10-416R | | Moore, Lisa (2010-11-09), "Consensus 125-C28, Motion 125-M1", UTC #125 / L2 #222 Minutes, "Change the block name and character names from "Sindhi" to "Khudawadi", U+11600 - U+1164F." |
| 7.0 | U+112B0..112EA, 112F0..112F9 | 69 | L2/11-022 | N3979 | Pandey, Anshuman (2011-01-28), Final Proposal to Encode the Khudawadi Script in ISO/IEC 10646 |
| 7.0 | U+112B0..112EA, 112F0..112F9 | 69 | | N3903 (pdf, doc) | "M57.17", Unconfirmed minutes of WG2 meeting 57, 2011-03-31 |
| 7.0 | U+112B0..112EA, 112F0..112F9 | 69 | | N4103 | "T.1. Sindhi", Unconfirmed minutes of WG 2 meeting 58, 2012-01-03 |
