= Sindhi workies =

Group of Sindhi merchants and traders during British-rule

Sindhi workies, also called Sindworkis, Sindworkies, or Sindwork merchants (Sindhi: سِنڌُ وَرِڪِي ; Urdu: سندھ ورکی ; Hindi: सिंधवर्की), were wealthy Hindu traders and merchants from the Sindh region of British India. This merchant class rapidly gained prominence during the British rule of India and spread their businesses overseas to places as far as Malta, South Africa and Singapore.

Many of the Sindhi workies were from the Bhaiband merchant caste, Sindhi Sonara (Hyderabadi) and to some degree the Amils, who were based and lived in Hyderabad. They established their businesses on the supply of traditional Sindhi arts and crafts, collectively known as Sindhi work or Sindwork, particularly in the British and European markets. The Sindhi workies were amongst the first Indian traders to establish business outside of India, particularly in places where the British had influence.

Due to the nature of their business, the men traditionally spent only six months at a time at home in Hyderabad, followed by up to three years abroad. It was the women and children of these Sindhi workies who were left to look after their homes and who later established a new-age Hindu socio-religious movement in Hyderabad known as Om Mandali (now Brahma Kumaris).

== History ==
When the British took over Sindh, many of the Bhaiband and Amil castes of Sindhi Hindu Lohanas residing in Hyderabad took advantage of the British rule. They “strengthened their commercial links between Sindh and Bombay to embark upon a completely new venture, [selling] local craft productions to European clientele”. These craft products became known as Sindwork in the European and British markets. Almost all of the Sindwork merchants were largely based in and around Hyderabad, while a few lived in Shikarpur and Sukkur.

In “[making] good use of the benefits of being British Indian subjects”, the Sindwork merchants established for themselves a sea-based network of commerce on a worldwide scale. The Sindwork merchants fared better than their Chinese and Japanese counterparts they didn’t have to face political obstacles and became “‘global middlemen’ between Far East and India". The Sindwork merchants had “privileged connections” with the Japanese and marched ahead of their Gujarati counterparts after being facilitated by the Chinese merchants’ boycott of Japanese goods following the Second Sino-Japanese War.

=== Sindwork trade ===
The Sindwork trade primarily included printed and embroidery materials, silks, silverware, lacquer ware, pottery and jewellery. Typically, Sindwork was produced by Muslim craftspeople and artisans, but because it was traded across the globe by Hindu traders, it brought immense wealth to these Hindu merchants who owned these firms. Such wealth was acquired by these traders that they fashioned their abodes into palatial mansions. Renowned scholar Rabindranath Tagore even called Hyderabad “the most fashionable city in India” because of this extravagant lifestyles of its trader citizens.

=== Hatta varnka ===
The Sindwork merchants had developed a special writing script that was used as a secret code while codifying their cash books and ledgers. This script was known under several names: hatta varnka, hat varnka, varnka, hattai, or hatvanika. Its use was not well documented and therefore scholars debate, to date, about the true meaning of this script. This script was used for business and overseas communications and its purpose was to make the company's accounting unintelligible to revenue collectors in order to enable tax evasion.

== See also ==
- Bhaiband
- Amils
- Hyderabad, also Hirabad
- Shikarpur
- Indian Maltese
