= Bhaiband =

Hindu jāti within the Sindhi caste of India and Pakistan

Bhaiband, (Sindhi: ڀائيبند (Perso-Arabic); (Devanagari) भाईबंद;) meaning “brotherhood”, are a sub-category of the Sindhi Lohana tribe.

== History ==
The Sindh region was called sindu or indus valley civilisation ruled by buddidt and several hindu kings before ruled by various Muslim dynasties only from 711 until the conquest by the British in 1843, when it became a part of Bombay Presidency. During that period, Hindus were a significant minority of the population although accurate figures continued to be unavailable until after 1947. Mark-Anthony Falzon notes that, "Due to the shifting criteria of categorisation and the complex politics of census in general, the decennial colonial censuses of pre-independence Sindh must be read with caution." Of these Hindus, most were broadly designated as members of the Lohana caste, with the exceptions being those considered to be Bhatias or Brahmins. Although some now considered to be Vaishya in the Hindu ritual ranking system known as varna, the Lohanas trace their origin as members of the Lohana varna from Raghuvanshi clan.

Among the Lohana jatis - a social grouping based on birth and kinship - are the Bhaibands, who by the time of the British Raj were held in a lesser useful than the Amil subgroup of Lohanas but who were the wealthiest as a result of their mobility and participation in trade. Although most of the Bhaibands around Nawabshah, Tando Adam Khan and Hyderabad in Sindh were ancestral Zamindaar and Jagirdars. They were also known for their fierce attitude and very well respected in surrounding Muslim population. Falzon considers their trade-sourced wealth to be their "distinguishing characteristic" among the Hindus of Sindh. (Note: Falzon notes that traders in small localities might be called bania or hatvania. It is unclear whether he is including the Bhaibands in this nomenclature.) Although it was generally uncommon, there was intermarriage between Amils, Bhaibands and another Lohana jati, the Sahitis. The ritual prohibitions of caste, such as restrictions on eating and worshipping together, permeate life in south India but did not play a great role in the life of Sindhis. Nonetheless, a hierarchy existed and, according to Falzon, "still today, Bhaibands are seen by Amils as unpolished, having poor aesthetic tastes, and given to vulgar displays of wealth". While Bhaibands always saw Amils as subservient to rulers or government and doubt their own ability to be rich and successful.

== See also ==
- Khudabad
- Khudabadi script
- Purswani
