= Shahi Bazaar =

Bazaar in Hyderabad, Sindh, Pakistan

Shahi Bazaar شاہی بازار
- Bazaar
- Interactive map of Shahi Bazaar
- Coordinates: 25°23′21″N 68°22′20″E
- Country: Pakistan
- Province: Sindh
- District: Hyderabad District
- City: Hyderabad
- Elevation: 43 m (141 ft)
- Time zone: UTC+5 (PST)

Shahi Bazaar (Urdu: شاہی بازار, romanized: Shāhī Bāzār, lit. 'Royal Marketplace') is a bazaar situated in Hyderabad, Sindh. It is one of the longest bazaars in Asia. The market begins from Pacco Qillo and concludes at Market Tower.
