= Amils =

Sub-group of Sindhi Lohana

The Amils (Sindhi: عامل) are a Sindhi Hindu sub-group of Lohana. The word "Amil" has its origin in the Persian word "amal" (as "administer"). Amils used to work in Administration in Government services.

Amils and Bhaibands were the communities that were one of the earliest to take up English education during British colonial rule. They were, along with the Parsis, the closest to the British and were regularly sent to Britain in order to seal business deals on behalf of the East India Company.

== Amils in Sindh ==
Amongst Sindhi Hindus, socially this clan ranks first in the hierarchical ranking among followed by Bhaiband. The Amils held the highest administrative offices under Muslim rulers, beginning in the mid-eighteenth century. They speak Sindhi. In 1938, Amils were primarily bankers, clerks, and minor officials. Amils are by no means the wealthiest in the Sindhi community but are highly educated professionals, often to this day.

Written historical accounts of the Amils in Sindh are rarely available. This article has been presented on the basis of some available documents and information received from elders. Hindus lived in abundance in Sindh, these Lohanas come in the order of inheritance. Before Hindus learn about "Amil" and "Bhaiband" in Sindhi.

Lohana inheritance

According to Skanda Purana, Lohana is a Suryavanshi Kshatriya Thakur. These Kshatriyas have been called Lohanas because of their settlement in strong forts like iron and making iron weapons. The word Lohana is a short form of Loh-Rana or Lohar-Rana. Lohana is an ancient dynasty History of Lohana Basically Lohana is a major community of Kshatriya varna. It originated in the region of Punjab in northwest India and later migrated to Sindh Gujarat state of India about 800 years ago. They became prominent residents of Sindh, so the original place of Lohanas is considered to be Sindh. As administrator and ruler, Kshatriya Lohana was entrusted with the task of protecting the people and serving humanity. However, over time, as a result of economic and political requirements, Lohana has been engaged mainly in mercantile businesses. According to historians, the Lohanas have their roots in the Indian subcontinent before the arrival of the Aryans, who consider them possibly the oldest living community in the world. According to mythology, Rama is believed to be an incarnation of Lord Vishnu, the protector of the universe. It is believed that Lord Rama divided his vast kingdom into eight parts, one part each of which was given to eight children of himself and his three brothers. Rama's elder son was Kush, who was given the south skill which was in the Gangetic basin. The descendants of Kush are known as Kushwaha. Rama's younger son was Luva, who was given the answer (Uttar Kaushal) of his kingdom (ref: Valmiki Ramayana Uttar Kand Sarga 107), which was later called Lavkar or the land of Luv which includes the present day Lahore (capital of Pakistan. In Ramayana, Luv is described as a great warrior, he along with his elder brother Kush stopped the horse and the entire army of his father Lord Rama's Ashwamedha Yagya. It is said that the descendants of Luv then moved westwards and established their rule over today's Afghanistan and surrounding areas as well. There is also evidence of this fact in the writings of the Chinese traveler "Fahiyan" (who came to India between 414 and 399 BC), he calls Lohana a brave community ruling the northwestern region of India. "Colonel Tod" who studied the history of Rajasthan intensively, describes Lohana as the oldest Kshatriya community. Around 580 BCE, when King Bimbisara ruled over India (India), the society got divided into different communities based on their occupation. One of their communities was called Kshatriyas and the descendants of King Love were grouped with them and came to be known as Luvanam, also known as Luvana. Luwanas of Loharghat were known as Loharana (lord of swords; or iron chieftains (iron = iron, rana = chieftains)), who later became Lohana. Everyone from Fahiyan down to the bottom recognizes Lohana as a brave community. One of the possible reasons for this bravery is that for centuries they found themselves falling in the direct path of invaders coming from the north-west such as the Persians, Macedonians, Huns, Mughals, etc. Over time, the power of the Lohnas of Sindh started decreasing and they felt that their identity was being threatened in Sindh, so they started migrating to Kutch, Saurashtra, Gujarat and even Thailand. In Gujarat, the Lohanas who perform the rituals are called Pujars and the descendants of Udero Lal (Darya Lal) are known as Ratnani. Gujarat Lohana women are praised as they say that only Rajputani, Loharani and Mianai give birth to children with gems. It is said that in 1422 AD, 700 Lohana families converted to Islam at the hands of Sayyid Yusufuddin Qadri in Thatta Sindh, now known as Memon. Lohanas are still found in Afghanistan and Pakistan, which are now Islamic states. But they still retain their religious identity and are known as Lokahathra. Lohana, who maintains his Hindu identity in Sindh, is known as Sindhi Lohana. In the early 20th century, a large number of Hindu Lohanas from Gujarat migrated to the British colonies of East Africa, with their descendants moving to Great Britain in recent decades. Many of them have settled in North West London and Leicester. Many Lohana Sindhi Samaj migrated to different cities in Gujarat and all over the India of India after partition, in Gujarat they are known as Ladi Lohana Sindhi Samaj. Lord Jhulelal, also belongs to the Suryavanshi Lohana family, his two brothers Somrai and Bhedu rai family also live in other cities of India.

Sindhi Amil and Bhaiband

Among the Sindhis, there were two classes: Amil and Bhaiband. Inter-caste marriages between them were rare in Sindh, but now these class distinctions are almost over and socially they question only Nukkh (gotra) and where they were living in Sindh for marriage. The native Amils in Sindh are also called Aalim, Amil, Diwan, Munshi. The Bhaibands or Vanya were usually merchants, who are called Vaishyas in the varna system. At the same time, the Amil or Diwan people were employed, more educated and of urban mentality, they were considered to be of Kshatriya varna. Most of the Amils were natives of Sindh, some historians say that some "Amils" were residents of Rajasthan who migrated to Sindh.

Who were the migratory Amils in Sindh?

And when did they reach Sindh? There is no published history or any record available to know these things. Therefore, it has also included limited data extracted from historical material and newspapers, and information from the elderly. Most of the Amils who are currently in Sindh came from Multan or Uch (Uch-i-Sharif, south of Multan); Both are located in Punjab. Some of the brothers living in Sindh have also come from Punjab, while others have come from Jaisalmer, Jodhpur (both in Rajasthan) and Gujarat. Some of the present-day Amils are Khatri Lohanas, and belong to warrior castes. Although the Amil family were Hindus in origin, some were influenced by Sikhism while living in Punjab or converted to Sikhism. Bherumal comments that today, some Amils of Hyderabad (Sindh) continue to uphold the Sikh traditions of the Panch-kesh (five Ka kars of Khalsa Sikhs: one of the Ka kars in which the hair of the head and face are kept. While most of these migrants continue to worship Guru Nanik as their ishta-devata (beloved deity), some have decided not to follow the pancha-kesh tradition after the migration. Such traditions have been going on since the time of Guru Nanik Sahib.

Did Amil come to Sindh from Punjab?

Some historians say that the "Amils" came to Sindh from Punjab, Rajasthan, and other states, although there is no official evidence. It is said that some people came because of the oppression of the emperor; Some had migrated for business purposes and employment, while others were doing so for personal or family reasons. For them, the route to Sindh, being a historical trade route, already existed. It is now necessary to discuss which categories of Amil families migrated from Punjab to Sindh. According to some senior elders (who were aware of Hindu family groups and their migration to Sindh), four complete family groups "Pada" and nine close family groups "Vedah" came to Sindh during this migration. "Vedaha" refers to Amil groups which were of different identities by Nukh (tribe, native) but were still connected to each other through matrimonial relations, meaning Vedaha means closely connected families, and "pada" refers to Amil groups that have neither the same identity (Nukh) nor any family relations. (However, they are neighbours in the same city/village). It is said that the "Vedaha" migrants were earlier closely connected families in Punjab, and there were inter-marriages among their castes. Both Pada and Vedaha Amils originally migrated from Punjab to Nawabshah and Hyderabad. Over time, other Hindus from Punjab migrated to the cities of Sukkur and Jacobabad in Sindh. Some of the families migrated from Punjab to Jodhpur and Gujarat and then to Hyderabad and Sindh.

Sindhi surname

Surnames have been prevalent among the Amil Sindhis, they used to write surnames with "Ni", "Ani" or "Ani" with the name of a famous or famous ancestor of their generation of 10-20-30 or more. The four early migrant Amil "Pada" (neighbours) people had surnames (surnames ), Vaswani, Idnani, Kirpalani and Mirchandani, and nine early Amil migrants were surnames of "Vedaha" (relative) migrants: Advani, Gidwani, Chandiramani, Malkani, Sipahimalani, Wadhwani, Punwani, Mansukhani and Shivdasani. In time, his descendants started writing some new surnames like Ajbani, Puniyani, Jagtyani, Jethmalani, Mansukhani etc. Some Amils were influenced by small European surnames and started shortening their surnames, Shivdasani became Sunny, Sipahmalani became Lani, Thadani became Thad and Kirpalani became Kripp, although this change did not last much, otherwise today many Sindhis would also be found with such surnames. The tradition of writing surname or surname was only in Sindh among the Amils, Bhaibands or other Sindhis used to write either Sindhi or surname according to the family name or identity of the place of residence. Every tradition changes according to place and time, now in the last 50-60 years, almost every Indian has started writing Sindhi surname or surname. In Sindh, "Amil" married only Amil and the ancestral surname was carried out. Gradually, the discrimination of Amil Bhaiband in marriage decreased. At present, it has become very difficult to know whether someone is Amil or Bhaiband. Although this is a good change from the point of view of social harmony, still a large "elite class" does not like and accept it.

Amil – Religion and Languages

Initially, Amil and Diwan lived only in a few cities like Hyderabad, then gradually they started living in many other parts of Sindh province. The Amils lived in many cities like Larkana, Khairpur, Shikarpur, Sukkur, Dadu, all the Amils were interconnected by social institutions, groups and means like marriage. The origin of the Amil families in Sindh can be firmly established through their religion and language. Thus, the Amil and the merchants who came with him from Punjab mostly belong to the Sikh sect. Before the migration, these Amils were influenced by the "Five Ks" of Sikh traditions. Some of them had grown their hair and had sabers. Some wore a bracelet and some a brief. Many of the Khudabadi Amils (who later migrated from Khudabad, South to Hyderabad) had kept their hair growing, but most have now stopped the practice, although some Amils in Hyderabad still have long hair. One thing that was also in the Sindhi Amils earlier was that if the same father had two children, one used to grow the hair and follow the rules of the family, and the other used to follow the rules of the family without growing the hair. However, most of the Amil Sindhis were followers of Guru Nanak Dev. Although they adopted the worship system and beliefs of Sikhism, they also followed their original beliefs. Most Amils revere their gods and goddesses, Darya Sai (river, reservoir), and serve Thakur (Krishna. Many also believe in Lord Shiva and Hinglaj Mata. Then some Amils of Hyderabad adopted the idea and Guru of the then "Brahmo Samaj". Besides, some Amils who followed movements like "Arya Samaj", "Dev Samaj", "Radhaswami" and others were originally of Sikh origin, immigrating to Sindh from Punjab. Other Amils who were not from Punjab but lived close to Punjab's Amil communities eventually adopted a lifestyle of homogeneity. In the month of Sawan, many Amil Gogio (Nag Panchami) festival is celebrated, it is believed that he was a Chauhan of Rajput dynasty of Rajasthan, his temple is found in Punjab. Amidst this mixed form of religious traditions and beliefs, in some cases, in marriage ceremonies, some Amils recite bhajans (Vdhis) that have their origins in Kutch.

Superiority Complex of Amils

The thinking of the Amils was such that they considered themselves to be the superior class of Sindhi society. Although such thinking is a flaw in today's social context, due to the then social structure, the Amil people considered their own amil as their specialty. In fact, they were educated, employed and considered themselves relatively advanced socially. They (Amils) used to marry their boys mostly in Amils but sometimes due to reasons like dowry etc., they also marry their sons in the families of Mukhi, Sindhvarki and Bhaiband Seth, but when it came to the marriage of their daughters, the Amils preferred to marry only in the Amils, They consider marriage to a rich brotherly businessman as beneath their dignity.

Amil Marriage

The grooms wore long mukat (crown, head dress), in addition, the bride and groom sat on the sandali (wooden seat). Earlier brides used to wear long veils and heads were so bowed that maids had to help the groom. Then from 1917 there was a change and brides started sitting upright and the long veil also gradually decreased. During the marriage, the bride's right hand is joined to the groom's left hand and covered with a dupatta (long dupatta. This aspect of the ceremony is called Hathiyalo and prayers are offered to the Mother Goddess to keep the couple safe. The prevailing customs, mannerisms, variations in the use and pronunciation of the Sindhi language/dialect help in determining the class of the Aamil people and their place of origin. Other customs such as purdah and restrictions on women have been influenced by the then Muslim rulers, and were passed down by the Amil elders. Lifestyle changes with time, and customs also change accordingly, now a lot has changed.

Sindhi Language and Dialects

Various forms of Sindhi language were also prevalent in Sindh such as...

- Vicholi: spoken around Hyderabad and central Sindh (Vicholo region).
- Uttaradi: Larkana, Shikarpur and Sukkur and parts of Kandiaro.
- Lari: spoken around areas such as Karachi, Thatta, Sujawal, Tando Muhammad Khan and Badin districts.
- Siroli/Siraiki or Ubhezi: Mainly spoken in Jacobabad and Kashmore districts.
- Lasi: spoken in Lasbela, Hube and Gwadar districts of Balochistan.
- Firaki Sindhi: is a dialect of the Kachhi plains spoken in the north eastern districts of Balochistan.
- Thareli: spoken in the north eastern Thar Desert of Sindh, called Nara Desert (Achro Thar).
- Sindhi Bhili: Sindhi is spoken by Meghwars and Bhils.

Costumes and ornaments of the Amils

Men: Five thousand years ago, in the Mahabharata period, Hindus used to carry "mukta" (crown-tricolor) on their heads. According to ancient customs, Lord Krishna was also following this practice. Even today, like Shri Krishna, the groom wears free and other ornaments around the neck and hands. All the Amils continue this tradition, as do other Hindus. Elderly Hindus wear half-sleeve shirts like Christians. It is shorter than the common traditional kurta, but longer than the sadri (waistcoat). Later, Hindus started wearing turbans (turbans. These were in different styles across India – depending on the location and customs. The Sindhi Bhaibands still follow the ancient customs of their dress. However, the attire of the Amils has changed over time, though they wear turbans and dhoti on occasions of marriage and death. The practice of "turban-ceremony" (tying a turban to signify the succession of the eldest son) after death among the Amils and Bhaibands began when the turban was generally worn. When Amil worked for Kalhora and Mir (after about 1720) he used to wear long turbans, flowing pyjamas (trousers) and mojri chappals (folded slippers with fancy embroidery). Like his Mir masters, the Amils also supported the waistband and long scarves around the neck. In school, even Amil children wore caps (kinkhab. Embroidered hats) like other Mir children. Nowadays, legal men (lawyers) wear such caps when appearing in court, a formality that began when Amil Mir was present at the court. Today's Amil also wears long kurtas and sadri (waistcoat) like Mir. Bherumal remarks that the button strips of Muslim kurtas are on the right side of the garment, while the buttons of Hindus are on the left.

Women: Amil women also adopted the custom of dressing the Muslim Mir women. They wore bangles in both the upper and lower parts of the hand and skirts (petticoats tied at the waist). Some Amil families also adopted the Muslim veil. During that period, the use of ornaments such as anklets, forehead ornaments, rings for fingers, ears and feet were in vogue. Less affluent Amils who can't afford fine leather shoes (juttis) are buying rough leather shoes. Bherumal said the Amil women's shoes were inextricably embroidered, with light colours used on the fabric covering the toes, and they were flat. Each shoe was held securely on the foot using one or two toes, which were visible through embroidered cloth. Over the past 25 years, clogs shoes have become outdated; In the last 10 years it has completely gone out of fashion. Slippers (without shoelaces and back) or flat slippers, are in common use. In this era of rapid change, heels are in fashion.

Young: Previously, both young and old wore long coats with closed collars; Later only the elderly wore this dress, the young people prefer coats made of Madrasi fabric with a check pattern, which costs about 5-6 annas per yard. The sewing fee is about 5 annas per coat. Around 1880, a barter system existed; It has now disappeared. Boys from affluent Amil families wear cholas (shirts), whose collars are embroidered with gold and silver threads (mukes. The caps they wear on their heads are also embroidered. Ribbon tassels that swing left and right when the head is shaken are added in the middle of the cap. Some hats have background designs, often decorated with silver or gold bands. At home, the Amil wear thin embroidered caps or simple silk cloth caps (caps. Many wealthy Amils wear caps made of muslin or thick poplin under their turbans and also put on a dupatta. Amil wears dhoti and turban only on occasions of marriage and death; Otherwise they generally wear caps (brocade caps). After the fashion of mukes (gold and silver thread) and zari (gold lace) on hats, came the fashion of velvet hats with flat tops, which are currently adopted by only a few amils. A few years ago, Turkish fez and "Bangalore cap" were in vogue. The general use of hats is still in fashion.

Sindhis are basically followers of Sanatan Dharma. The influence of three traditions is seen on the rituals, rituals and rituals. The inhabitants of the northwestern part of the province of Sindh believe in the Shakta sect according to the Goddess Hinglaj Mata and Varun avatar Jhule Lal Sai, the people of the central province through which the Indus River flows to Jhule Lal Sai and Guru Nanak Dev, and the inhabitants of the southeast part of Sindh province close to Punjab are widely considered Jhulelal Sai, Guru Nanak Dev believes in. All Sindhis universally believe in Lord Shiva, Rama and Krishna. The influence of Mughal Mirs (big zamindars or nawabs) in Sindh was so strong that some Amils were also used to celebrate and cooperate with the Muslim religionists.

Amil women wore glass, and gold bangles in the belief and hope that it would bring more prosperity. Marriage symbols like vermillion, mangalsutra etc. were not used in Sindh. In Sindhi families, the daughter's parents used to send sweets, fruits, clothes and ornaments as gifts to their son-in-law and their parents, siblings. This practice is still in vogue today. There is also a mention of another Amil system, this practice was followed by Amil women to determine the outcome of their desires, whether a particular work would be successful or not, whether the expected person would actually come or not and this practice was for testing other such desires. This involved wearing as many costume jewellery bangles as possible with the hand. If there was an excess of three bangles, the wish would fail; A plethora of two bangles meant success, and a bangle meant that the wish would take time to come true. The Amils generally spend heavily on marriage and death rituals, although some prefer a simpler and cost-effective method. In the absence of potato cutlets, bread cutlets, mutton chops or omelettes, dinner parties are considered tasteless. Amils are very hospitable in which guests are welcomed and welcomed with great respect. The guests are served such fine and delicious food that the memories of good hospitality remain forever for the guests. It is true that Amil considered himself to be of the upper class and even if no one was financially affluent, the living and performance remained of the upper class. Slowly there were changes. Inter-class, inter-caste marriages started happening in abundance and in the last 60-70 years there has been so much social and ideological change that now the difference between the Amil Bhaibands has reduced considerably. Whether this change is good or bad depends on everyone's own perspective. Hope you like this information. We are grateful for the book "Amilan Jo Ahwal", which was published in Sindhi language in 1919 (it is not easily available), and whose English translation "A History of the Amils" was published from Hong Kong, this book is available. In this article, some information has also been taken from the book Amilan Jo Ahwal and most of the things have been obtained from private sources.

== Notable Amils include ==
- LK Advani: Politician
- Ram Jethmalani (1923 – 2019): Lawyer and politician
- Niranjan Hiranandani: construction magnate
- Meera Sanyal: RBS chairman and AAP politician.
- Babita Kapoor: Actress Daughter of Hari Shivdasani
- Hari Shivdasani: A prominent Bollywood Character actor
- Sadhna Shivdasani: Bollywood actress
- S.P Hinduja and Hinduja Family: Wealthiest Indian family in the United Kingdom.
- Kewalram Ratanmal Malkani: politician
- Ranveer Singh: Bollywood actor
- Nikhil Advani: Film Director
- Pankaj Advani: World Snooker Champion
